

259001–259100 

|-bgcolor=#E9E9E9
| 259001 ||  || — || October 1, 2002 || Anderson Mesa || LONEOS || — || align=right | 1.3 km || 
|-id=002 bgcolor=#fefefe
| 259002 ||  || — || October 3, 2002 || Socorro || LINEAR || SUL || align=right | 2.1 km || 
|-id=003 bgcolor=#fefefe
| 259003 ||  || — || October 3, 2002 || Socorro || LINEAR || MAS || align=right data-sort-value="0.77" | 770 m || 
|-id=004 bgcolor=#E9E9E9
| 259004 ||  || — || October 4, 2002 || Socorro || LINEAR || — || align=right | 1.0 km || 
|-id=005 bgcolor=#E9E9E9
| 259005 ||  || — || October 4, 2002 || Socorro || LINEAR || — || align=right | 1.2 km || 
|-id=006 bgcolor=#fefefe
| 259006 ||  || — || October 4, 2002 || Socorro || LINEAR || V || align=right data-sort-value="0.84" | 840 m || 
|-id=007 bgcolor=#fefefe
| 259007 ||  || — || October 2, 2002 || Campo Imperatore || CINEOS || V || align=right data-sort-value="0.87" | 870 m || 
|-id=008 bgcolor=#E9E9E9
| 259008 ||  || — || October 3, 2002 || Palomar || NEAT || MAR || align=right | 1.6 km || 
|-id=009 bgcolor=#E9E9E9
| 259009 ||  || — || October 3, 2002 || Palomar || NEAT || — || align=right | 2.4 km || 
|-id=010 bgcolor=#E9E9E9
| 259010 ||  || — || October 3, 2002 || Palomar || NEAT || — || align=right | 1.6 km || 
|-id=011 bgcolor=#E9E9E9
| 259011 ||  || — || October 3, 2002 || Palomar || NEAT || — || align=right | 1.5 km || 
|-id=012 bgcolor=#E9E9E9
| 259012 ||  || — || October 3, 2002 || Palomar || NEAT || RAF || align=right | 1.2 km || 
|-id=013 bgcolor=#fefefe
| 259013 ||  || — || October 3, 2002 || Campo Imperatore || CINEOS || FLO || align=right | 1.0 km || 
|-id=014 bgcolor=#fefefe
| 259014 ||  || — || October 4, 2002 || Socorro || LINEAR || V || align=right data-sort-value="0.97" | 970 m || 
|-id=015 bgcolor=#fefefe
| 259015 ||  || — || October 3, 2002 || Socorro || LINEAR || NYS || align=right | 1.0 km || 
|-id=016 bgcolor=#E9E9E9
| 259016 ||  || — || October 5, 2002 || Palomar || NEAT || — || align=right | 1.5 km || 
|-id=017 bgcolor=#E9E9E9
| 259017 ||  || — || October 5, 2002 || Palomar || NEAT || — || align=right | 3.0 km || 
|-id=018 bgcolor=#fefefe
| 259018 ||  || — || October 5, 2002 || Palomar || NEAT || — || align=right | 1.5 km || 
|-id=019 bgcolor=#E9E9E9
| 259019 ||  || — || October 4, 2002 || Socorro || LINEAR || — || align=right | 1.2 km || 
|-id=020 bgcolor=#fefefe
| 259020 ||  || — || October 11, 2002 || Palomar || NEAT || H || align=right | 1.2 km || 
|-id=021 bgcolor=#E9E9E9
| 259021 ||  || — || October 5, 2002 || Socorro || LINEAR || — || align=right | 1.4 km || 
|-id=022 bgcolor=#fefefe
| 259022 ||  || — || October 13, 2002 || Eskridge || G. Hug || — || align=right | 1.1 km || 
|-id=023 bgcolor=#fefefe
| 259023 ||  || — || October 3, 2002 || Socorro || LINEAR || MAS || align=right | 1.1 km || 
|-id=024 bgcolor=#fefefe
| 259024 ||  || — || October 3, 2002 || Socorro || LINEAR || MAS || align=right data-sort-value="0.99" | 990 m || 
|-id=025 bgcolor=#E9E9E9
| 259025 ||  || — || October 8, 2002 || Bergisch Gladbach || W. Bickel || — || align=right | 1.9 km || 
|-id=026 bgcolor=#fefefe
| 259026 ||  || — || October 4, 2002 || Socorro || LINEAR || — || align=right | 1.6 km || 
|-id=027 bgcolor=#fefefe
| 259027 ||  || — || October 4, 2002 || Socorro || LINEAR || ERI || align=right | 2.8 km || 
|-id=028 bgcolor=#E9E9E9
| 259028 ||  || — || October 5, 2002 || Palomar || NEAT || — || align=right | 1.5 km || 
|-id=029 bgcolor=#E9E9E9
| 259029 ||  || — || October 7, 2002 || Anderson Mesa || LONEOS || — || align=right | 1.3 km || 
|-id=030 bgcolor=#E9E9E9
| 259030 ||  || — || October 7, 2002 || Socorro || LINEAR || — || align=right data-sort-value="0.95" | 950 m || 
|-id=031 bgcolor=#fefefe
| 259031 ||  || — || October 8, 2002 || Anderson Mesa || LONEOS || NYS || align=right data-sort-value="0.97" | 970 m || 
|-id=032 bgcolor=#fefefe
| 259032 ||  || — || October 8, 2002 || Anderson Mesa || LONEOS || — || align=right | 1.2 km || 
|-id=033 bgcolor=#fefefe
| 259033 ||  || — || October 8, 2002 || Anderson Mesa || LONEOS || NYS || align=right | 1.0 km || 
|-id=034 bgcolor=#E9E9E9
| 259034 ||  || — || October 6, 2002 || Socorro || LINEAR || JUN || align=right | 1.6 km || 
|-id=035 bgcolor=#fefefe
| 259035 ||  || — || October 6, 2002 || Socorro || LINEAR || — || align=right | 3.6 km || 
|-id=036 bgcolor=#fefefe
| 259036 ||  || — || October 8, 2002 || Anderson Mesa || LONEOS || — || align=right | 1.4 km || 
|-id=037 bgcolor=#E9E9E9
| 259037 ||  || — || October 7, 2002 || Socorro || LINEAR || — || align=right | 1.2 km || 
|-id=038 bgcolor=#fefefe
| 259038 ||  || — || October 7, 2002 || Socorro || LINEAR || — || align=right | 1.1 km || 
|-id=039 bgcolor=#fefefe
| 259039 ||  || — || October 9, 2002 || Anderson Mesa || LONEOS || NYS || align=right data-sort-value="0.85" | 850 m || 
|-id=040 bgcolor=#fefefe
| 259040 ||  || — || October 9, 2002 || Socorro || LINEAR || MAS || align=right data-sort-value="0.90" | 900 m || 
|-id=041 bgcolor=#fefefe
| 259041 ||  || — || October 9, 2002 || Socorro || LINEAR || — || align=right | 1.6 km || 
|-id=042 bgcolor=#E9E9E9
| 259042 ||  || — || October 10, 2002 || Socorro || LINEAR || — || align=right | 1.0 km || 
|-id=043 bgcolor=#E9E9E9
| 259043 ||  || — || October 10, 2002 || Socorro || LINEAR || — || align=right | 2.1 km || 
|-id=044 bgcolor=#fefefe
| 259044 ||  || — || October 10, 2002 || Socorro || LINEAR || V || align=right | 1.2 km || 
|-id=045 bgcolor=#E9E9E9
| 259045 ||  || — || October 4, 2002 || Apache Point || SDSS || — || align=right data-sort-value="0.75" | 750 m || 
|-id=046 bgcolor=#E9E9E9
| 259046 ||  || — || October 4, 2002 || Apache Point || SDSS || — || align=right | 2.8 km || 
|-id=047 bgcolor=#E9E9E9
| 259047 ||  || — || October 4, 2002 || Apache Point || SDSS || HNS || align=right | 1.6 km || 
|-id=048 bgcolor=#E9E9E9
| 259048 ||  || — || October 5, 2002 || Apache Point || SDSS || — || align=right | 1.6 km || 
|-id=049 bgcolor=#fefefe
| 259049 ||  || — || October 5, 2002 || Apache Point || SDSS || — || align=right | 1.1 km || 
|-id=050 bgcolor=#fefefe
| 259050 ||  || — || October 5, 2002 || Apache Point || SDSS || — || align=right | 1.3 km || 
|-id=051 bgcolor=#E9E9E9
| 259051 ||  || — || October 5, 2002 || Apache Point || SDSS || — || align=right | 1.5 km || 
|-id=052 bgcolor=#fefefe
| 259052 ||  || — || October 10, 2002 || Apache Point || SDSS || NYS || align=right data-sort-value="0.68" | 680 m || 
|-id=053 bgcolor=#fefefe
| 259053 ||  || — || October 10, 2002 || Apache Point || SDSS || V || align=right data-sort-value="0.68" | 680 m || 
|-id=054 bgcolor=#fefefe
| 259054 ||  || — || October 9, 2002 || Palomar || NEAT || — || align=right | 1.2 km || 
|-id=055 bgcolor=#E9E9E9
| 259055 ||  || — || October 11, 2002 || Apache Point || SDSS || — || align=right | 1.3 km || 
|-id=056 bgcolor=#fefefe
| 259056 ||  || — || October 13, 2002 || Palomar || NEAT || H || align=right data-sort-value="0.74" | 740 m || 
|-id=057 bgcolor=#E9E9E9
| 259057 ||  || — || October 6, 2002 || Palomar || NEAT || — || align=right | 1.6 km || 
|-id=058 bgcolor=#E9E9E9
| 259058 ||  || — || October 4, 2002 || Apache Point || SDSS || EUN || align=right | 1.7 km || 
|-id=059 bgcolor=#FA8072
| 259059 ||  || — || October 28, 2002 || Socorro || LINEAR || H || align=right | 1.3 km || 
|-id=060 bgcolor=#FA8072
| 259060 ||  || — || October 28, 2002 || Socorro || LINEAR || H || align=right | 1.0 km || 
|-id=061 bgcolor=#E9E9E9
| 259061 ||  || — || October 28, 2002 || Palomar || NEAT || — || align=right | 1.1 km || 
|-id=062 bgcolor=#E9E9E9
| 259062 ||  || — || October 28, 2002 || Palomar || NEAT || — || align=right | 2.6 km || 
|-id=063 bgcolor=#fefefe
| 259063 ||  || — || October 30, 2002 || Socorro || LINEAR || H || align=right data-sort-value="0.95" | 950 m || 
|-id=064 bgcolor=#E9E9E9
| 259064 ||  || — || October 30, 2002 || Palomar || NEAT || — || align=right | 1.3 km || 
|-id=065 bgcolor=#fefefe
| 259065 ||  || — || October 30, 2002 || Haleakala || NEAT || NYS || align=right data-sort-value="0.99" | 990 m || 
|-id=066 bgcolor=#E9E9E9
| 259066 ||  || — || October 28, 2002 || Palomar || NEAT || — || align=right | 1.7 km || 
|-id=067 bgcolor=#E9E9E9
| 259067 ||  || — || October 31, 2002 || Anderson Mesa || LONEOS || — || align=right | 1.6 km || 
|-id=068 bgcolor=#FA8072
| 259068 ||  || — || October 31, 2002 || Socorro || LINEAR || — || align=right | 2.1 km || 
|-id=069 bgcolor=#fefefe
| 259069 ||  || — || October 31, 2002 || Palomar || NEAT || V || align=right | 1.1 km || 
|-id=070 bgcolor=#fefefe
| 259070 ||  || — || October 29, 2002 || Apache Point || SDSS || — || align=right | 1.1 km || 
|-id=071 bgcolor=#fefefe
| 259071 ||  || — || October 30, 2002 || Apache Point || SDSS || MAS || align=right data-sort-value="0.99" | 990 m || 
|-id=072 bgcolor=#fefefe
| 259072 ||  || — || October 30, 2002 || Apache Point || SDSS || — || align=right data-sort-value="0.94" | 940 m || 
|-id=073 bgcolor=#E9E9E9
| 259073 ||  || — || October 31, 2002 || Palomar || NEAT || — || align=right data-sort-value="0.89" | 890 m || 
|-id=074 bgcolor=#fefefe
| 259074 ||  || — || November 1, 2002 || Palomar || NEAT || V || align=right data-sort-value="0.95" | 950 m || 
|-id=075 bgcolor=#E9E9E9
| 259075 ||  || — || November 1, 2002 || Palomar || NEAT || — || align=right | 2.1 km || 
|-id=076 bgcolor=#E9E9E9
| 259076 ||  || — || November 5, 2002 || Socorro || LINEAR || — || align=right | 2.9 km || 
|-id=077 bgcolor=#E9E9E9
| 259077 ||  || — || November 5, 2002 || Socorro || LINEAR || — || align=right | 1.1 km || 
|-id=078 bgcolor=#E9E9E9
| 259078 ||  || — || November 5, 2002 || Socorro || LINEAR || MAR || align=right | 1.5 km || 
|-id=079 bgcolor=#fefefe
| 259079 ||  || — || November 5, 2002 || Socorro || LINEAR || NYS || align=right data-sort-value="0.79" | 790 m || 
|-id=080 bgcolor=#fefefe
| 259080 ||  || — || November 5, 2002 || Socorro || LINEAR || NYS || align=right data-sort-value="0.97" | 970 m || 
|-id=081 bgcolor=#fefefe
| 259081 ||  || — || November 5, 2002 || Anderson Mesa || LONEOS || NYS || align=right | 1.1 km || 
|-id=082 bgcolor=#E9E9E9
| 259082 ||  || — || November 5, 2002 || Socorro || LINEAR || — || align=right | 3.4 km || 
|-id=083 bgcolor=#fefefe
| 259083 ||  || — || November 5, 2002 || Socorro || LINEAR || MAS || align=right | 1.1 km || 
|-id=084 bgcolor=#E9E9E9
| 259084 ||  || — || November 5, 2002 || Socorro || LINEAR || — || align=right | 2.2 km || 
|-id=085 bgcolor=#E9E9E9
| 259085 ||  || — || November 5, 2002 || Palomar || NEAT || — || align=right | 1.1 km || 
|-id=086 bgcolor=#fefefe
| 259086 ||  || — || November 6, 2002 || Anderson Mesa || LONEOS || V || align=right data-sort-value="0.99" | 990 m || 
|-id=087 bgcolor=#E9E9E9
| 259087 ||  || — || November 6, 2002 || Haleakala || NEAT || MIS || align=right | 3.3 km || 
|-id=088 bgcolor=#fefefe
| 259088 ||  || — || November 8, 2002 || Socorro || LINEAR || H || align=right | 1.00 km || 
|-id=089 bgcolor=#E9E9E9
| 259089 ||  || — || November 7, 2002 || Kitt Peak || Spacewatch || — || align=right | 1.4 km || 
|-id=090 bgcolor=#E9E9E9
| 259090 ||  || — || November 12, 2002 || Socorro || LINEAR || DOR || align=right | 4.4 km || 
|-id=091 bgcolor=#E9E9E9
| 259091 ||  || — || November 13, 2002 || Socorro || LINEAR || BAR || align=right | 1.9 km || 
|-id=092 bgcolor=#E9E9E9
| 259092 ||  || — || November 12, 2002 || Socorro || LINEAR || — || align=right | 1.8 km || 
|-id=093 bgcolor=#fefefe
| 259093 ||  || — || November 12, 2002 || Socorro || LINEAR || — || align=right | 1.2 km || 
|-id=094 bgcolor=#E9E9E9
| 259094 ||  || — || November 13, 2002 || Palomar || NEAT || — || align=right | 2.8 km || 
|-id=095 bgcolor=#fefefe
| 259095 ||  || — || November 11, 2002 || Socorro || LINEAR || — || align=right | 1.2 km || 
|-id=096 bgcolor=#E9E9E9
| 259096 ||  || — || November 13, 2002 || Palomar || NEAT || — || align=right | 2.2 km || 
|-id=097 bgcolor=#fefefe
| 259097 ||  || — || November 14, 2002 || Palomar || NEAT || H || align=right data-sort-value="0.79" | 790 m || 
|-id=098 bgcolor=#fefefe
| 259098 ||  || — || November 14, 2002 || Palomar || NEAT || H || align=right | 1.1 km || 
|-id=099 bgcolor=#fefefe
| 259099 ||  || — || November 5, 2002 || Palomar || NEAT || — || align=right | 1.1 km || 
|-id=100 bgcolor=#E9E9E9
| 259100 ||  || — || November 15, 2002 || Palomar || NEAT || — || align=right | 1.7 km || 
|}

259101–259200 

|-bgcolor=#FA8072
| 259101 ||  || — || November 20, 2002 || Socorro || LINEAR || — || align=right | 2.1 km || 
|-id=102 bgcolor=#fefefe
| 259102 ||  || — || November 23, 2002 || Palomar || NEAT || — || align=right | 1.2 km || 
|-id=103 bgcolor=#fefefe
| 259103 ||  || — || November 24, 2002 || Palomar || NEAT || — || align=right | 1.4 km || 
|-id=104 bgcolor=#fefefe
| 259104 ||  || — || November 24, 2002 || Palomar || NEAT || NYS || align=right data-sort-value="0.96" | 960 m || 
|-id=105 bgcolor=#E9E9E9
| 259105 ||  || — || November 24, 2002 || Palomar || NEAT || — || align=right | 4.1 km || 
|-id=106 bgcolor=#E9E9E9
| 259106 ||  || — || November 24, 2002 || Palomar || NEAT || — || align=right | 3.3 km || 
|-id=107 bgcolor=#E9E9E9
| 259107 ||  || — || November 28, 2002 || Anderson Mesa || LONEOS || — || align=right | 1.5 km || 
|-id=108 bgcolor=#fefefe
| 259108 ||  || — || November 28, 2002 || Anderson Mesa || LONEOS || — || align=right | 1.7 km || 
|-id=109 bgcolor=#fefefe
| 259109 ||  || — || November 30, 2002 || Socorro || LINEAR || — || align=right | 1.6 km || 
|-id=110 bgcolor=#E9E9E9
| 259110 ||  || — || November 25, 2002 || Lulin Observatory || Lulin Obs. || — || align=right | 1.1 km || 
|-id=111 bgcolor=#E9E9E9
| 259111 ||  || — || November 24, 2002 || Palomar || S. F. Hönig || — || align=right data-sort-value="0.98" | 980 m || 
|-id=112 bgcolor=#E9E9E9
| 259112 ||  || — || December 2, 2002 || Socorro || LINEAR || MAR || align=right | 1.7 km || 
|-id=113 bgcolor=#E9E9E9
| 259113 ||  || — || December 2, 2002 || Socorro || LINEAR || — || align=right | 1.9 km || 
|-id=114 bgcolor=#E9E9E9
| 259114 ||  || — || December 1, 2002 || Haleakala || NEAT || — || align=right | 1.6 km || 
|-id=115 bgcolor=#fefefe
| 259115 ||  || — || December 3, 2002 || Palomar || NEAT || NYS || align=right | 1.2 km || 
|-id=116 bgcolor=#fefefe
| 259116 ||  || — || December 3, 2002 || Palomar || NEAT || — || align=right | 1.3 km || 
|-id=117 bgcolor=#fefefe
| 259117 ||  || — || December 3, 2002 || Palomar || NEAT || V || align=right | 1.2 km || 
|-id=118 bgcolor=#fefefe
| 259118 ||  || — || December 2, 2002 || Haleakala || NEAT || H || align=right data-sort-value="0.90" | 900 m || 
|-id=119 bgcolor=#E9E9E9
| 259119 ||  || — || December 5, 2002 || Socorro || LINEAR || — || align=right | 2.3 km || 
|-id=120 bgcolor=#fefefe
| 259120 ||  || — || December 3, 2002 || Palomar || NEAT || H || align=right data-sort-value="0.87" | 870 m || 
|-id=121 bgcolor=#fefefe
| 259121 ||  || — || December 3, 2002 || Palomar || NEAT || H || align=right data-sort-value="0.89" | 890 m || 
|-id=122 bgcolor=#E9E9E9
| 259122 ||  || — || December 5, 2002 || Kitt Peak || Spacewatch || HNS || align=right | 1.9 km || 
|-id=123 bgcolor=#fefefe
| 259123 ||  || — || December 6, 2002 || Socorro || LINEAR || H || align=right data-sort-value="0.91" | 910 m || 
|-id=124 bgcolor=#E9E9E9
| 259124 ||  || — || December 6, 2002 || Socorro || LINEAR || — || align=right | 2.0 km || 
|-id=125 bgcolor=#E9E9E9
| 259125 ||  || — || December 7, 2002 || Kitt Peak || Spacewatch || — || align=right | 4.9 km || 
|-id=126 bgcolor=#E9E9E9
| 259126 ||  || — || December 7, 2002 || Socorro || LINEAR || MIT || align=right | 4.0 km || 
|-id=127 bgcolor=#fefefe
| 259127 ||  || — || December 12, 2002 || Haleakala || NEAT || — || align=right | 1.4 km || 
|-id=128 bgcolor=#fefefe
| 259128 ||  || — || December 10, 2002 || Socorro || LINEAR || H || align=right data-sort-value="0.93" | 930 m || 
|-id=129 bgcolor=#E9E9E9
| 259129 ||  || — || December 7, 2002 || Socorro || LINEAR || — || align=right | 2.7 km || 
|-id=130 bgcolor=#E9E9E9
| 259130 ||  || — || December 10, 2002 || Socorro || LINEAR || — || align=right | 2.1 km || 
|-id=131 bgcolor=#E9E9E9
| 259131 ||  || — || December 10, 2002 || Socorro || LINEAR || — || align=right | 2.5 km || 
|-id=132 bgcolor=#FA8072
| 259132 ||  || — || December 10, 2002 || Palomar || NEAT || H || align=right | 1.1 km || 
|-id=133 bgcolor=#E9E9E9
| 259133 ||  || — || December 10, 2002 || Palomar || NEAT || — || align=right | 2.0 km || 
|-id=134 bgcolor=#fefefe
| 259134 ||  || — || December 11, 2002 || Socorro || LINEAR || H || align=right data-sort-value="0.84" | 840 m || 
|-id=135 bgcolor=#E9E9E9
| 259135 ||  || — || December 11, 2002 || Socorro || LINEAR || — || align=right | 1.6 km || 
|-id=136 bgcolor=#E9E9E9
| 259136 ||  || — || December 11, 2002 || Palomar || NEAT || — || align=right | 1.6 km || 
|-id=137 bgcolor=#fefefe
| 259137 ||  || — || December 11, 2002 || Socorro || LINEAR || H || align=right | 1.1 km || 
|-id=138 bgcolor=#E9E9E9
| 259138 ||  || — || December 10, 2002 || Socorro || LINEAR || — || align=right | 1.6 km || 
|-id=139 bgcolor=#E9E9E9
| 259139 ||  || — || December 10, 2002 || Socorro || LINEAR || ADE || align=right | 3.2 km || 
|-id=140 bgcolor=#E9E9E9
| 259140 ||  || — || December 10, 2002 || Palomar || NEAT || — || align=right | 1.3 km || 
|-id=141 bgcolor=#E9E9E9
| 259141 ||  || — || December 11, 2002 || Socorro || LINEAR || — || align=right | 2.0 km || 
|-id=142 bgcolor=#E9E9E9
| 259142 ||  || — || December 11, 2002 || Socorro || LINEAR || — || align=right | 1.5 km || 
|-id=143 bgcolor=#E9E9E9
| 259143 ||  || — || December 11, 2002 || Socorro || LINEAR || — || align=right | 4.2 km || 
|-id=144 bgcolor=#E9E9E9
| 259144 ||  || — || December 11, 2002 || Socorro || LINEAR || ADE || align=right | 3.0 km || 
|-id=145 bgcolor=#FA8072
| 259145 ||  || — || December 12, 2002 || Socorro || LINEAR || — || align=right data-sort-value="0.88" | 880 m || 
|-id=146 bgcolor=#FA8072
| 259146 ||  || — || December 13, 2002 || Socorro || LINEAR || — || align=right | 2.2 km || 
|-id=147 bgcolor=#fefefe
| 259147 ||  || — || December 14, 2002 || Socorro || LINEAR || H || align=right | 1.1 km || 
|-id=148 bgcolor=#E9E9E9
| 259148 ||  || — || December 9, 2002 || Bergisch Gladbac || W. Bickel || — || align=right | 1.9 km || 
|-id=149 bgcolor=#fefefe
| 259149 ||  || — || December 14, 2002 || Socorro || LINEAR || — || align=right | 1.3 km || 
|-id=150 bgcolor=#E9E9E9
| 259150 ||  || — || December 5, 2002 || Socorro || LINEAR || — || align=right | 1.5 km || 
|-id=151 bgcolor=#E9E9E9
| 259151 ||  || — || December 5, 2002 || Socorro || LINEAR || — || align=right | 1.4 km || 
|-id=152 bgcolor=#E9E9E9
| 259152 ||  || — || December 5, 2002 || Socorro || LINEAR || — || align=right | 2.5 km || 
|-id=153 bgcolor=#E9E9E9
| 259153 ||  || — || December 6, 2002 || Socorro || LINEAR || GER || align=right | 2.0 km || 
|-id=154 bgcolor=#E9E9E9
| 259154 ||  || — || December 6, 2002 || Socorro || LINEAR || — || align=right | 2.9 km || 
|-id=155 bgcolor=#E9E9E9
| 259155 ||  || — || December 8, 2002 || Bergisch Gladbac || W. Bickel || WIT || align=right | 1.0 km || 
|-id=156 bgcolor=#E9E9E9
| 259156 ||  || — || December 7, 2002 || Apache Point || SDSS || — || align=right | 2.0 km || 
|-id=157 bgcolor=#E9E9E9
| 259157 ||  || — || December 7, 2002 || Apache Point || SDSS || — || align=right | 3.1 km || 
|-id=158 bgcolor=#E9E9E9
| 259158 ||  || — || December 14, 2002 || Apache Point || SDSS || — || align=right | 1.3 km || 
|-id=159 bgcolor=#E9E9E9
| 259159 ||  || — || December 5, 2002 || Palomar || NEAT || — || align=right | 1.7 km || 
|-id=160 bgcolor=#E9E9E9
| 259160 ||  || — || December 7, 2002 || Palomar || NEAT || — || align=right | 2.9 km || 
|-id=161 bgcolor=#fefefe
| 259161 ||  || — || December 28, 2002 || Socorro || LINEAR || H || align=right data-sort-value="0.95" | 950 m || 
|-id=162 bgcolor=#E9E9E9
| 259162 ||  || — || December 28, 2002 || Needville || Needville Obs. || — || align=right | 1.5 km || 
|-id=163 bgcolor=#fefefe
| 259163 ||  || — || December 31, 2002 || Socorro || LINEAR || H || align=right data-sort-value="0.98" | 980 m || 
|-id=164 bgcolor=#E9E9E9
| 259164 ||  || — || December 31, 2002 || Kitt Peak || Spacewatch || — || align=right | 3.0 km || 
|-id=165 bgcolor=#fefefe
| 259165 ||  || — || December 31, 2002 || Socorro || LINEAR || — || align=right | 1.4 km || 
|-id=166 bgcolor=#E9E9E9
| 259166 ||  || — || December 31, 2002 || Socorro || LINEAR || — || align=right | 1.5 km || 
|-id=167 bgcolor=#E9E9E9
| 259167 ||  || — || December 31, 2002 || Socorro || LINEAR || JUN || align=right | 1.5 km || 
|-id=168 bgcolor=#E9E9E9
| 259168 ||  || — || December 31, 2002 || Socorro || LINEAR || — || align=right | 1.2 km || 
|-id=169 bgcolor=#E9E9E9
| 259169 ||  || — || December 31, 2002 || Socorro || LINEAR || — || align=right | 1.3 km || 
|-id=170 bgcolor=#E9E9E9
| 259170 ||  || — || December 31, 2002 || Socorro || LINEAR || — || align=right | 1.9 km || 
|-id=171 bgcolor=#E9E9E9
| 259171 || 2003 AB || — || January 1, 2003 || Tebbutt || F. B. Zoltowski || — || align=right | 1.5 km || 
|-id=172 bgcolor=#E9E9E9
| 259172 ||  || — || January 1, 2003 || Socorro || LINEAR || — || align=right | 1.9 km || 
|-id=173 bgcolor=#E9E9E9
| 259173 ||  || — || January 1, 2003 || Socorro || LINEAR || — || align=right | 1.6 km || 
|-id=174 bgcolor=#fefefe
| 259174 ||  || — || January 2, 2003 || Socorro || LINEAR || H || align=right | 1.4 km || 
|-id=175 bgcolor=#E9E9E9
| 259175 ||  || — || January 1, 2003 || Socorro || LINEAR || — || align=right | 1.6 km || 
|-id=176 bgcolor=#fefefe
| 259176 ||  || — || January 2, 2003 || Socorro || LINEAR || H || align=right | 1.1 km || 
|-id=177 bgcolor=#E9E9E9
| 259177 ||  || — || January 1, 2003 || Kitt Peak || Spacewatch || — || align=right | 2.9 km || 
|-id=178 bgcolor=#E9E9E9
| 259178 ||  || — || January 3, 2003 || Socorro || LINEAR || — || align=right | 2.4 km || 
|-id=179 bgcolor=#E9E9E9
| 259179 ||  || — || January 4, 2003 || Socorro || LINEAR || BAR || align=right | 2.2 km || 
|-id=180 bgcolor=#E9E9E9
| 259180 ||  || — || January 1, 2003 || Socorro || LINEAR || — || align=right | 1.5 km || 
|-id=181 bgcolor=#E9E9E9
| 259181 ||  || — || January 1, 2003 || Socorro || LINEAR || — || align=right | 2.5 km || 
|-id=182 bgcolor=#E9E9E9
| 259182 ||  || — || January 1, 2003 || Socorro || LINEAR || — || align=right | 1.8 km || 
|-id=183 bgcolor=#d6d6d6
| 259183 ||  || — || January 4, 2003 || Kitt Peak || Spacewatch || 3:2 || align=right | 8.0 km || 
|-id=184 bgcolor=#fefefe
| 259184 ||  || — || January 5, 2003 || Socorro || LINEAR || H || align=right | 1.1 km || 
|-id=185 bgcolor=#fefefe
| 259185 ||  || — || January 5, 2003 || Socorro || LINEAR || H || align=right | 1.3 km || 
|-id=186 bgcolor=#E9E9E9
| 259186 ||  || — || January 4, 2003 || Socorro || LINEAR || — || align=right | 1.8 km || 
|-id=187 bgcolor=#E9E9E9
| 259187 ||  || — || January 4, 2003 || Kitt Peak || Spacewatch || — || align=right | 1.9 km || 
|-id=188 bgcolor=#E9E9E9
| 259188 ||  || — || January 4, 2003 || Socorro || LINEAR || — || align=right | 2.4 km || 
|-id=189 bgcolor=#E9E9E9
| 259189 ||  || — || January 4, 2003 || Socorro || LINEAR || — || align=right | 2.2 km || 
|-id=190 bgcolor=#E9E9E9
| 259190 ||  || — || January 4, 2003 || Kitt Peak || Spacewatch || MIS || align=right | 2.9 km || 
|-id=191 bgcolor=#E9E9E9
| 259191 ||  || — || January 5, 2003 || Kitt Peak || Spacewatch || — || align=right | 2.1 km || 
|-id=192 bgcolor=#E9E9E9
| 259192 ||  || — || January 7, 2003 || Socorro || LINEAR || — || align=right | 3.2 km || 
|-id=193 bgcolor=#fefefe
| 259193 ||  || — || January 7, 2003 || Socorro || LINEAR || NYS || align=right | 1.1 km || 
|-id=194 bgcolor=#E9E9E9
| 259194 ||  || — || January 7, 2003 || Socorro || LINEAR || DOR || align=right | 3.6 km || 
|-id=195 bgcolor=#E9E9E9
| 259195 ||  || — || January 7, 2003 || Socorro || LINEAR || — || align=right | 2.9 km || 
|-id=196 bgcolor=#E9E9E9
| 259196 ||  || — || January 7, 2003 || Socorro || LINEAR || — || align=right | 1.0 km || 
|-id=197 bgcolor=#E9E9E9
| 259197 ||  || — || January 7, 2003 || Socorro || LINEAR || — || align=right | 1.8 km || 
|-id=198 bgcolor=#E9E9E9
| 259198 ||  || — || January 7, 2003 || Socorro || LINEAR || — || align=right | 1.4 km || 
|-id=199 bgcolor=#E9E9E9
| 259199 ||  || — || January 5, 2003 || Socorro || LINEAR || GEF || align=right | 1.6 km || 
|-id=200 bgcolor=#E9E9E9
| 259200 ||  || — || January 5, 2003 || Socorro || LINEAR || — || align=right | 2.1 km || 
|}

259201–259300 

|-bgcolor=#E9E9E9
| 259201 ||  || — || January 5, 2003 || Socorro || LINEAR || — || align=right | 1.6 km || 
|-id=202 bgcolor=#E9E9E9
| 259202 ||  || — || January 5, 2003 || Socorro || LINEAR || EUN || align=right | 1.8 km || 
|-id=203 bgcolor=#E9E9E9
| 259203 ||  || — || January 5, 2003 || Socorro || LINEAR || — || align=right | 1.3 km || 
|-id=204 bgcolor=#E9E9E9
| 259204 ||  || — || January 5, 2003 || Socorro || LINEAR || — || align=right | 1.5 km || 
|-id=205 bgcolor=#E9E9E9
| 259205 ||  || — || January 5, 2003 || Socorro || LINEAR || ADE || align=right | 2.5 km || 
|-id=206 bgcolor=#E9E9E9
| 259206 ||  || — || January 5, 2003 || Socorro || LINEAR || — || align=right | 1.8 km || 
|-id=207 bgcolor=#E9E9E9
| 259207 ||  || — || January 7, 2003 || Socorro || LINEAR || — || align=right | 1.5 km || 
|-id=208 bgcolor=#E9E9E9
| 259208 ||  || — || January 8, 2003 || Socorro || LINEAR || — || align=right | 2.3 km || 
|-id=209 bgcolor=#fefefe
| 259209 ||  || — || January 10, 2003 || Socorro || LINEAR || H || align=right | 1.1 km || 
|-id=210 bgcolor=#E9E9E9
| 259210 ||  || — || January 11, 2003 || Socorro || LINEAR || — || align=right | 4.3 km || 
|-id=211 bgcolor=#fefefe
| 259211 ||  || — || January 11, 2003 || Socorro || LINEAR || H || align=right data-sort-value="0.87" | 870 m || 
|-id=212 bgcolor=#fefefe
| 259212 ||  || — || January 13, 2003 || Desert Moon || B. L. Stevens || — || align=right | 1.5 km || 
|-id=213 bgcolor=#E9E9E9
| 259213 ||  || — || January 17, 2003 || Palomar || NEAT || — || align=right | 2.7 km || 
|-id=214 bgcolor=#E9E9E9
| 259214 ||  || — || January 24, 2003 || Palomar || NEAT || ADE || align=right | 2.4 km || 
|-id=215 bgcolor=#E9E9E9
| 259215 ||  || — || January 26, 2003 || Palomar || NEAT || — || align=right | 2.9 km || 
|-id=216 bgcolor=#E9E9E9
| 259216 ||  || — || January 26, 2003 || Haleakala || NEAT || — || align=right | 1.9 km || 
|-id=217 bgcolor=#E9E9E9
| 259217 ||  || — || January 26, 2003 || Haleakala || NEAT || — || align=right | 2.4 km || 
|-id=218 bgcolor=#E9E9E9
| 259218 ||  || — || January 26, 2003 || Haleakala || NEAT || — || align=right | 1.8 km || 
|-id=219 bgcolor=#E9E9E9
| 259219 ||  || — || January 27, 2003 || Socorro || LINEAR || — || align=right | 2.4 km || 
|-id=220 bgcolor=#d6d6d6
| 259220 ||  || — || January 27, 2003 || Anderson Mesa || LONEOS || — || align=right | 4.6 km || 
|-id=221 bgcolor=#FFC2E0
| 259221 ||  || — || January 27, 2003 || Socorro || LINEAR || APO || align=right data-sort-value="0.54" | 540 m || 
|-id=222 bgcolor=#E9E9E9
| 259222 ||  || — || January 25, 2003 || Palomar || NEAT || — || align=right | 2.0 km || 
|-id=223 bgcolor=#E9E9E9
| 259223 ||  || — || January 25, 2003 || Palomar || NEAT || EUN || align=right | 2.0 km || 
|-id=224 bgcolor=#E9E9E9
| 259224 ||  || — || January 25, 2003 || Palomar || NEAT || — || align=right | 2.1 km || 
|-id=225 bgcolor=#E9E9E9
| 259225 ||  || — || January 26, 2003 || Palomar || NEAT || — || align=right | 2.7 km || 
|-id=226 bgcolor=#E9E9E9
| 259226 ||  || — || January 26, 2003 || Anderson Mesa || LONEOS || EUN || align=right | 2.1 km || 
|-id=227 bgcolor=#E9E9E9
| 259227 ||  || — || January 26, 2003 || Anderson Mesa || LONEOS || — || align=right | 2.0 km || 
|-id=228 bgcolor=#E9E9E9
| 259228 ||  || — || January 26, 2003 || Haleakala || NEAT || CLO || align=right | 3.2 km || 
|-id=229 bgcolor=#E9E9E9
| 259229 ||  || — || January 27, 2003 || Socorro || LINEAR || — || align=right | 1.6 km || 
|-id=230 bgcolor=#E9E9E9
| 259230 ||  || — || January 27, 2003 || Socorro || LINEAR || — || align=right | 1.6 km || 
|-id=231 bgcolor=#E9E9E9
| 259231 ||  || — || January 27, 2003 || Anderson Mesa || LONEOS || MRX || align=right | 1.5 km || 
|-id=232 bgcolor=#E9E9E9
| 259232 ||  || — || January 27, 2003 || Socorro || LINEAR || — || align=right | 1.3 km || 
|-id=233 bgcolor=#E9E9E9
| 259233 ||  || — || January 27, 2003 || Palomar || NEAT || GEF || align=right | 1.6 km || 
|-id=234 bgcolor=#E9E9E9
| 259234 ||  || — || January 27, 2003 || Socorro || LINEAR || — || align=right | 1.4 km || 
|-id=235 bgcolor=#E9E9E9
| 259235 ||  || — || January 27, 2003 || Socorro || LINEAR || — || align=right | 2.6 km || 
|-id=236 bgcolor=#E9E9E9
| 259236 ||  || — || January 27, 2003 || Socorro || LINEAR || MAR || align=right | 1.7 km || 
|-id=237 bgcolor=#E9E9E9
| 259237 ||  || — || January 27, 2003 || Anderson Mesa || LONEOS || — || align=right | 2.8 km || 
|-id=238 bgcolor=#E9E9E9
| 259238 ||  || — || January 27, 2003 || Socorro || LINEAR || — || align=right | 1.0 km || 
|-id=239 bgcolor=#E9E9E9
| 259239 ||  || — || January 27, 2003 || Socorro || LINEAR || — || align=right | 2.0 km || 
|-id=240 bgcolor=#E9E9E9
| 259240 ||  || — || January 28, 2003 || Socorro || LINEAR || JUN || align=right | 1.8 km || 
|-id=241 bgcolor=#E9E9E9
| 259241 ||  || — || January 29, 2003 || Palomar || NEAT || — || align=right | 1.4 km || 
|-id=242 bgcolor=#E9E9E9
| 259242 ||  || — || January 30, 2003 || Haleakala || NEAT || — || align=right | 1.2 km || 
|-id=243 bgcolor=#E9E9E9
| 259243 ||  || — || January 30, 2003 || Haleakala || NEAT || — || align=right | 2.5 km || 
|-id=244 bgcolor=#E9E9E9
| 259244 ||  || — || January 30, 2003 || Haleakala || NEAT || — || align=right | 3.5 km || 
|-id=245 bgcolor=#E9E9E9
| 259245 ||  || — || January 28, 2003 || Socorro || LINEAR || ADE || align=right | 2.4 km || 
|-id=246 bgcolor=#E9E9E9
| 259246 ||  || — || January 29, 2003 || Palomar || NEAT || — || align=right | 2.0 km || 
|-id=247 bgcolor=#E9E9E9
| 259247 ||  || — || January 29, 2003 || Palomar || NEAT || — || align=right | 2.3 km || 
|-id=248 bgcolor=#E9E9E9
| 259248 ||  || — || January 30, 2003 || Haleakala || NEAT || — || align=right | 1.3 km || 
|-id=249 bgcolor=#E9E9E9
| 259249 ||  || — || January 31, 2003 || Socorro || LINEAR || — || align=right | 1.2 km || 
|-id=250 bgcolor=#E9E9E9
| 259250 ||  || — || January 27, 2003 || Anderson Mesa || LONEOS || — || align=right | 1.6 km || 
|-id=251 bgcolor=#E9E9E9
| 259251 ||  || — || January 29, 2003 || Palomar || NEAT || — || align=right | 1.8 km || 
|-id=252 bgcolor=#E9E9E9
| 259252 ||  || — || January 16, 2003 || Palomar || NEAT || — || align=right | 2.7 km || 
|-id=253 bgcolor=#fefefe
| 259253 ||  || — || February 1, 2003 || Socorro || LINEAR || H || align=right data-sort-value="0.92" | 920 m || 
|-id=254 bgcolor=#E9E9E9
| 259254 ||  || — || February 1, 2003 || Anderson Mesa || LONEOS || — || align=right | 2.3 km || 
|-id=255 bgcolor=#E9E9E9
| 259255 ||  || — || February 2, 2003 || Haleakala || NEAT || — || align=right data-sort-value="0.97" | 970 m || 
|-id=256 bgcolor=#E9E9E9
| 259256 ||  || — || February 1, 2003 || Socorro || LINEAR || — || align=right | 2.3 km || 
|-id=257 bgcolor=#E9E9E9
| 259257 ||  || — || February 1, 2003 || Socorro || LINEAR || — || align=right | 1.6 km || 
|-id=258 bgcolor=#d6d6d6
| 259258 ||  || — || February 1, 2003 || Socorro || LINEAR || 3:2 || align=right | 7.4 km || 
|-id=259 bgcolor=#E9E9E9
| 259259 ||  || — || February 1, 2003 || Socorro || LINEAR || — || align=right | 2.7 km || 
|-id=260 bgcolor=#E9E9E9
| 259260 ||  || — || February 2, 2003 || Socorro || LINEAR || — || align=right | 4.3 km || 
|-id=261 bgcolor=#E9E9E9
| 259261 ||  || — || February 2, 2003 || Socorro || LINEAR || — || align=right | 2.1 km || 
|-id=262 bgcolor=#E9E9E9
| 259262 ||  || — || February 3, 2003 || Haleakala || NEAT || — || align=right | 1.7 km || 
|-id=263 bgcolor=#E9E9E9
| 259263 ||  || — || February 2, 2003 || Palomar || NEAT || — || align=right | 2.7 km || 
|-id=264 bgcolor=#E9E9E9
| 259264 ||  || — || February 2, 2003 || Palomar || NEAT || — || align=right | 1.4 km || 
|-id=265 bgcolor=#E9E9E9
| 259265 ||  || — || February 4, 2003 || Anderson Mesa || LONEOS || EUN || align=right | 2.0 km || 
|-id=266 bgcolor=#E9E9E9
| 259266 ||  || — || February 4, 2003 || Anderson Mesa || LONEOS || JUN || align=right | 1.3 km || 
|-id=267 bgcolor=#fefefe
| 259267 ||  || — || February 6, 2003 || Palomar || NEAT || H || align=right | 1.0 km || 
|-id=268 bgcolor=#E9E9E9
| 259268 ||  || — || February 7, 2003 || Desert Eagle || W. K. Y. Yeung || — || align=right | 2.0 km || 
|-id=269 bgcolor=#E9E9E9
| 259269 ||  || — || February 10, 2003 || Socorro || LINEAR || — || align=right | 2.7 km || 
|-id=270 bgcolor=#d6d6d6
| 259270 ||  || — || February 8, 2003 || Socorro || LINEAR || — || align=right | 3.9 km || 
|-id=271 bgcolor=#E9E9E9
| 259271 ||  || — || February 11, 2003 || Socorro || LINEAR || — || align=right | 4.1 km || 
|-id=272 bgcolor=#E9E9E9
| 259272 ||  || — || February 1, 2003 || Palomar || NEAT || — || align=right | 3.5 km || 
|-id=273 bgcolor=#d6d6d6
| 259273 ||  || — || February 22, 2003 || Kitt Peak || Spacewatch || TRP || align=right | 3.8 km || 
|-id=274 bgcolor=#E9E9E9
| 259274 ||  || — || February 22, 2003 || Essen || Walter Hohmann Obs. || — || align=right | 2.1 km || 
|-id=275 bgcolor=#E9E9E9
| 259275 ||  || — || February 24, 2003 || Haleakala || NEAT || — || align=right | 3.3 km || 
|-id=276 bgcolor=#E9E9E9
| 259276 ||  || — || February 26, 2003 || Haleakala || NEAT || — || align=right | 1.9 km || 
|-id=277 bgcolor=#E9E9E9
| 259277 ||  || — || February 19, 2003 || Palomar || NEAT || — || align=right | 1.5 km || 
|-id=278 bgcolor=#E9E9E9
| 259278 ||  || — || February 22, 2003 || Palomar || NEAT || — || align=right | 1.3 km || 
|-id=279 bgcolor=#d6d6d6
| 259279 ||  || — || February 23, 2003 || Anderson Mesa || LONEOS || — || align=right | 3.2 km || 
|-id=280 bgcolor=#E9E9E9
| 259280 ||  || — || February 21, 2003 || Palomar || NEAT || — || align=right | 1.6 km || 
|-id=281 bgcolor=#E9E9E9
| 259281 ||  || — || March 2, 2003 || Socorro || LINEAR || — || align=right | 2.7 km || 
|-id=282 bgcolor=#d6d6d6
| 259282 ||  || — || March 5, 2003 || Socorro || LINEAR || THB || align=right | 5.1 km || 
|-id=283 bgcolor=#d6d6d6
| 259283 ||  || — || March 5, 2003 || Socorro || LINEAR || — || align=right | 3.7 km || 
|-id=284 bgcolor=#E9E9E9
| 259284 ||  || — || March 6, 2003 || Anderson Mesa || LONEOS || — || align=right | 1.3 km || 
|-id=285 bgcolor=#E9E9E9
| 259285 ||  || — || March 6, 2003 || Anderson Mesa || LONEOS || RAF || align=right | 1.4 km || 
|-id=286 bgcolor=#d6d6d6
| 259286 ||  || — || March 6, 2003 || Anderson Mesa || LONEOS || EUP || align=right | 4.7 km || 
|-id=287 bgcolor=#E9E9E9
| 259287 ||  || — || March 6, 2003 || Anderson Mesa || LONEOS || — || align=right | 3.8 km || 
|-id=288 bgcolor=#E9E9E9
| 259288 ||  || — || March 6, 2003 || Socorro || LINEAR || JUN || align=right | 1.4 km || 
|-id=289 bgcolor=#E9E9E9
| 259289 ||  || — || March 6, 2003 || Palomar || NEAT || — || align=right | 2.4 km || 
|-id=290 bgcolor=#E9E9E9
| 259290 ||  || — || March 7, 2003 || Socorro || LINEAR || — || align=right | 2.8 km || 
|-id=291 bgcolor=#E9E9E9
| 259291 ||  || — || March 7, 2003 || Anderson Mesa || LONEOS || — || align=right | 2.3 km || 
|-id=292 bgcolor=#E9E9E9
| 259292 ||  || — || March 8, 2003 || Anderson Mesa || LONEOS || ADE || align=right | 3.4 km || 
|-id=293 bgcolor=#E9E9E9
| 259293 ||  || — || March 8, 2003 || Anderson Mesa || LONEOS || — || align=right | 1.8 km || 
|-id=294 bgcolor=#E9E9E9
| 259294 ||  || — || March 8, 2003 || Kitt Peak || Spacewatch || — || align=right | 2.4 km || 
|-id=295 bgcolor=#E9E9E9
| 259295 ||  || — || March 8, 2003 || Socorro || LINEAR || ADE || align=right | 2.7 km || 
|-id=296 bgcolor=#E9E9E9
| 259296 ||  || — || March 9, 2003 || Socorro || LINEAR || — || align=right | 2.4 km || 
|-id=297 bgcolor=#d6d6d6
| 259297 ||  || — || March 7, 2003 || Socorro || LINEAR || — || align=right | 4.5 km || 
|-id=298 bgcolor=#E9E9E9
| 259298 ||  || — || March 10, 2003 || Socorro || LINEAR || — || align=right | 2.1 km || 
|-id=299 bgcolor=#E9E9E9
| 259299 ||  || — || March 9, 2003 || Socorro || LINEAR || — || align=right | 1.4 km || 
|-id=300 bgcolor=#E9E9E9
| 259300 ||  || — || March 9, 2003 || Anderson Mesa || LONEOS || JUN || align=right | 1.7 km || 
|}

259301–259400 

|-bgcolor=#E9E9E9
| 259301 ||  || — || March 9, 2003 || Palomar || NEAT || EUN || align=right | 2.0 km || 
|-id=302 bgcolor=#E9E9E9
| 259302 ||  || — || March 12, 2003 || Socorro || LINEAR || — || align=right | 1.7 km || 
|-id=303 bgcolor=#E9E9E9
| 259303 ||  || — || March 12, 2003 || Palomar || NEAT || — || align=right | 3.6 km || 
|-id=304 bgcolor=#E9E9E9
| 259304 ||  || — || March 10, 2003 || Anderson Mesa || LONEOS || — || align=right | 3.4 km || 
|-id=305 bgcolor=#E9E9E9
| 259305 ||  || — || March 3, 2003 || Socorro || LINEAR || — || align=right | 2.8 km || 
|-id=306 bgcolor=#E9E9E9
| 259306 ||  || — || March 8, 2003 || Kitt Peak || Spacewatch || NEM || align=right | 2.6 km || 
|-id=307 bgcolor=#d6d6d6
| 259307 ||  || — || March 6, 2003 || Anderson Mesa || LONEOS || — || align=right | 5.2 km || 
|-id=308 bgcolor=#fefefe
| 259308 ||  || — || March 23, 2003 || Kleť || J. Tichá, M. Tichý || — || align=right data-sort-value="0.98" | 980 m || 
|-id=309 bgcolor=#d6d6d6
| 259309 ||  || — || March 23, 2003 || Kleť || J. Tichá, M. Tichý || — || align=right | 3.2 km || 
|-id=310 bgcolor=#d6d6d6
| 259310 ||  || — || March 21, 2003 || Bergisch Gladbac || W. Bickel || — || align=right | 4.2 km || 
|-id=311 bgcolor=#E9E9E9
| 259311 ||  || — || March 23, 2003 || Palomar || NEAT || — || align=right | 2.9 km || 
|-id=312 bgcolor=#E9E9E9
| 259312 ||  || — || March 25, 2003 || Palomar || NEAT || — || align=right | 2.6 km || 
|-id=313 bgcolor=#E9E9E9
| 259313 ||  || — || March 31, 2003 || Anderson Mesa || LONEOS || — || align=right | 3.2 km || 
|-id=314 bgcolor=#d6d6d6
| 259314 ||  || — || March 23, 2003 || Kitt Peak || Spacewatch || MEL || align=right | 3.9 km || 
|-id=315 bgcolor=#E9E9E9
| 259315 ||  || — || March 23, 2003 || Kitt Peak || Spacewatch || — || align=right | 1.9 km || 
|-id=316 bgcolor=#C2FFFF
| 259316 ||  || — || March 23, 2003 || Kitt Peak || Spacewatch || L4ERY || align=right | 8.9 km || 
|-id=317 bgcolor=#d6d6d6
| 259317 ||  || — || March 24, 2003 || Kitt Peak || Spacewatch || NAE || align=right | 2.3 km || 
|-id=318 bgcolor=#E9E9E9
| 259318 ||  || — || March 24, 2003 || Kitt Peak || Spacewatch || — || align=right | 1.6 km || 
|-id=319 bgcolor=#E9E9E9
| 259319 ||  || — || March 26, 2003 || Palomar || NEAT || — || align=right | 1.5 km || 
|-id=320 bgcolor=#E9E9E9
| 259320 ||  || — || March 26, 2003 || Palomar || NEAT || — || align=right | 3.2 km || 
|-id=321 bgcolor=#E9E9E9
| 259321 ||  || — || March 26, 2003 || Palomar || NEAT || HOF || align=right | 3.6 km || 
|-id=322 bgcolor=#E9E9E9
| 259322 ||  || — || March 26, 2003 || Palomar || NEAT || — || align=right | 2.0 km || 
|-id=323 bgcolor=#E9E9E9
| 259323 ||  || — || March 26, 2003 || Palomar || NEAT || — || align=right | 3.4 km || 
|-id=324 bgcolor=#E9E9E9
| 259324 ||  || — || March 26, 2003 || Haleakala || NEAT || — || align=right | 1.9 km || 
|-id=325 bgcolor=#E9E9E9
| 259325 ||  || — || March 26, 2003 || Haleakala || NEAT || EUN || align=right | 2.1 km || 
|-id=326 bgcolor=#E9E9E9
| 259326 ||  || — || March 26, 2003 || Palomar || NEAT || — || align=right | 4.6 km || 
|-id=327 bgcolor=#d6d6d6
| 259327 ||  || — || March 29, 2003 || Anderson Mesa || LONEOS || — || align=right | 3.8 km || 
|-id=328 bgcolor=#d6d6d6
| 259328 ||  || — || March 29, 2003 || Anderson Mesa || LONEOS || — || align=right | 5.7 km || 
|-id=329 bgcolor=#d6d6d6
| 259329 ||  || — || March 29, 2003 || Anderson Mesa || LONEOS || LIX || align=right | 5.7 km || 
|-id=330 bgcolor=#d6d6d6
| 259330 ||  || — || March 30, 2003 || Anderson Mesa || LONEOS || EOS || align=right | 3.1 km || 
|-id=331 bgcolor=#E9E9E9
| 259331 ||  || — || March 30, 2003 || Kitt Peak || Spacewatch || — || align=right | 2.6 km || 
|-id=332 bgcolor=#E9E9E9
| 259332 ||  || — || March 30, 2003 || Palomar || NEAT || — || align=right | 1.8 km || 
|-id=333 bgcolor=#E9E9E9
| 259333 ||  || — || March 31, 2003 || Socorro || LINEAR || JUN || align=right | 1.5 km || 
|-id=334 bgcolor=#E9E9E9
| 259334 ||  || — || March 31, 2003 || Socorro || LINEAR || — || align=right | 2.3 km || 
|-id=335 bgcolor=#E9E9E9
| 259335 ||  || — || March 24, 2003 || Kitt Peak || Spacewatch || — || align=right | 3.8 km || 
|-id=336 bgcolor=#d6d6d6
| 259336 ||  || — || March 26, 2003 || Anderson Mesa || LONEOS || EOS || align=right | 2.4 km || 
|-id=337 bgcolor=#d6d6d6
| 259337 ||  || — || March 23, 2003 || Kitt Peak || Spacewatch || — || align=right | 4.7 km || 
|-id=338 bgcolor=#E9E9E9
| 259338 ||  || — || March 27, 2003 || Palomar || NEAT || AGN || align=right | 1.5 km || 
|-id=339 bgcolor=#E9E9E9
| 259339 ||  || — || March 24, 2003 || Kitt Peak || Spacewatch || — || align=right | 2.3 km || 
|-id=340 bgcolor=#E9E9E9
| 259340 ||  || — || March 31, 2003 || Kitt Peak || Spacewatch || — || align=right | 3.7 km || 
|-id=341 bgcolor=#d6d6d6
| 259341 ||  || — || March 31, 2003 || Kitt Peak || Spacewatch || — || align=right | 3.0 km || 
|-id=342 bgcolor=#C2FFFF
| 259342 ||  || — || March 24, 2003 || Kitt Peak || Spacewatch || L4 || align=right | 13 km || 
|-id=343 bgcolor=#C2FFFF
| 259343 ||  || — || March 27, 2003 || Kitt Peak || Spacewatch || L4 || align=right | 9.6 km || 
|-id=344 bgcolor=#E9E9E9
| 259344 Paré || 2003 GQ ||  || April 2, 2003 || Saint-Sulpice || B. Christophe || — || align=right | 2.0 km || 
|-id=345 bgcolor=#E9E9E9
| 259345 ||  || — || April 1, 2003 || Socorro || LINEAR || — || align=right | 2.0 km || 
|-id=346 bgcolor=#E9E9E9
| 259346 ||  || — || April 4, 2003 || Haleakala || NEAT || EUN || align=right | 2.2 km || 
|-id=347 bgcolor=#d6d6d6
| 259347 ||  || — || April 5, 2003 || Kitt Peak || Spacewatch || EOS || align=right | 2.2 km || 
|-id=348 bgcolor=#d6d6d6
| 259348 ||  || — || April 7, 2003 || Kitt Peak || Spacewatch || — || align=right | 3.6 km || 
|-id=349 bgcolor=#E9E9E9
| 259349 ||  || — || April 4, 2003 || Kitt Peak || Spacewatch || — || align=right | 2.1 km || 
|-id=350 bgcolor=#d6d6d6
| 259350 ||  || — || April 6, 2003 || Kitt Peak || Spacewatch || EOS || align=right | 2.6 km || 
|-id=351 bgcolor=#E9E9E9
| 259351 ||  || — || April 8, 2003 || Socorro || LINEAR || INO || align=right | 1.8 km || 
|-id=352 bgcolor=#E9E9E9
| 259352 ||  || — || April 5, 2003 || Anderson Mesa || LONEOS || — || align=right | 3.4 km || 
|-id=353 bgcolor=#FA8072
| 259353 ||  || — || April 9, 2003 || Kitt Peak || Spacewatch || — || align=right | 1.0 km || 
|-id=354 bgcolor=#E9E9E9
| 259354 ||  || — || April 9, 2003 || Haleakala || NEAT || — || align=right | 2.2 km || 
|-id=355 bgcolor=#E9E9E9
| 259355 ||  || — || April 8, 2003 || Palomar || NEAT || — || align=right | 2.5 km || 
|-id=356 bgcolor=#E9E9E9
| 259356 ||  || — || April 8, 2003 || Palomar || NEAT || NEM || align=right | 3.0 km || 
|-id=357 bgcolor=#C2FFFF
| 259357 ||  || — || April 8, 2003 || Palomar || NEAT || L4 || align=right | 12 km || 
|-id=358 bgcolor=#d6d6d6
| 259358 ||  || — || April 6, 2003 || Anderson Mesa || LONEOS || — || align=right | 4.3 km || 
|-id=359 bgcolor=#E9E9E9
| 259359 ||  || — || April 10, 2003 || Socorro || LINEAR || JUN || align=right | 1.5 km || 
|-id=360 bgcolor=#C2FFFF
| 259360 ||  || — || April 5, 2003 || Kitt Peak || Spacewatch || L4 || align=right | 12 km || 
|-id=361 bgcolor=#C2FFFF
| 259361 ||  || — || April 11, 2003 || Kitt Peak || Spacewatch || L4 || align=right | 17 km || 
|-id=362 bgcolor=#fefefe
| 259362 ||  || — || April 25, 2003 || Socorro || LINEAR || H || align=right | 1.1 km || 
|-id=363 bgcolor=#E9E9E9
| 259363 ||  || — || April 25, 2003 || Socorro || LINEAR || — || align=right | 2.9 km || 
|-id=364 bgcolor=#d6d6d6
| 259364 ||  || — || April 24, 2003 || Anderson Mesa || LONEOS || — || align=right | 3.9 km || 
|-id=365 bgcolor=#fefefe
| 259365 ||  || — || April 25, 2003 || Kitt Peak || Spacewatch || — || align=right data-sort-value="0.90" | 900 m || 
|-id=366 bgcolor=#d6d6d6
| 259366 ||  || — || April 23, 2003 || Campo Imperatore || CINEOS || — || align=right | 4.5 km || 
|-id=367 bgcolor=#E9E9E9
| 259367 ||  || — || April 24, 2003 || Anderson Mesa || LONEOS || — || align=right | 1.7 km || 
|-id=368 bgcolor=#E9E9E9
| 259368 ||  || — || April 25, 2003 || Anderson Mesa || LONEOS || JUN || align=right | 1.7 km || 
|-id=369 bgcolor=#E9E9E9
| 259369 ||  || — || April 24, 2003 || Kitt Peak || Spacewatch || — || align=right | 2.6 km || 
|-id=370 bgcolor=#C2FFFF
| 259370 ||  || — || April 26, 2003 || Haleakala || NEAT || L4 || align=right | 13 km || 
|-id=371 bgcolor=#fefefe
| 259371 ||  || — || April 24, 2003 || Socorro || LINEAR || H || align=right data-sort-value="0.85" | 850 m || 
|-id=372 bgcolor=#E9E9E9
| 259372 ||  || — || April 25, 2003 || Kitt Peak || Spacewatch || — || align=right | 2.8 km || 
|-id=373 bgcolor=#d6d6d6
| 259373 ||  || — || April 25, 2003 || Kitt Peak || Spacewatch || EOS || align=right | 2.2 km || 
|-id=374 bgcolor=#d6d6d6
| 259374 ||  || — || April 27, 2003 || Socorro || LINEAR || — || align=right | 4.0 km || 
|-id=375 bgcolor=#d6d6d6
| 259375 ||  || — || April 27, 2003 || Anderson Mesa || LONEOS || — || align=right | 3.8 km || 
|-id=376 bgcolor=#E9E9E9
| 259376 ||  || — || April 27, 2003 || Anderson Mesa || LONEOS || — || align=right | 2.9 km || 
|-id=377 bgcolor=#E9E9E9
| 259377 ||  || — || April 29, 2003 || Haleakala || NEAT || — || align=right | 2.2 km || 
|-id=378 bgcolor=#E9E9E9
| 259378 ||  || — || April 30, 2003 || Haleakala || NEAT || — || align=right | 3.2 km || 
|-id=379 bgcolor=#E9E9E9
| 259379 ||  || — || April 28, 2003 || Socorro || LINEAR || — || align=right | 2.6 km || 
|-id=380 bgcolor=#d6d6d6
| 259380 ||  || — || April 29, 2003 || Kitt Peak || Spacewatch || — || align=right | 6.6 km || 
|-id=381 bgcolor=#d6d6d6
| 259381 ||  || — || April 30, 2003 || Goodricke-Pigott || J. W. Kessel || — || align=right | 4.5 km || 
|-id=382 bgcolor=#d6d6d6
| 259382 ||  || — || April 25, 2003 || Kitt Peak || Spacewatch || — || align=right | 4.5 km || 
|-id=383 bgcolor=#E9E9E9
| 259383 ||  || — || May 2, 2003 || Socorro || LINEAR || — || align=right | 2.1 km || 
|-id=384 bgcolor=#d6d6d6
| 259384 ||  || — || May 4, 2003 || Kleť || J. Tichá, M. Tichý || — || align=right | 5.0 km || 
|-id=385 bgcolor=#E9E9E9
| 259385 ||  || — || May 22, 2003 || Kitt Peak || Spacewatch || — || align=right | 1.8 km || 
|-id=386 bgcolor=#d6d6d6
| 259386 ||  || — || May 23, 2003 || Kitt Peak || Spacewatch || — || align=right | 4.4 km || 
|-id=387 bgcolor=#E9E9E9
| 259387 Atauta ||  ||  || May 25, 2003 || Sierra Nevada || A. Sota || — || align=right | 3.1 km || 
|-id=388 bgcolor=#d6d6d6
| 259388 ||  || — || June 1, 2003 || Kitt Peak || Spacewatch || — || align=right | 3.5 km || 
|-id=389 bgcolor=#fefefe
| 259389 ||  || — || June 28, 2003 || Socorro || LINEAR || — || align=right data-sort-value="0.87" | 870 m || 
|-id=390 bgcolor=#fefefe
| 259390 ||  || — || July 7, 2003 || Reedy Creek || J. Broughton || — || align=right | 1.0 km || 
|-id=391 bgcolor=#d6d6d6
| 259391 ||  || — || July 22, 2003 || Haleakala || NEAT || — || align=right | 4.1 km || 
|-id=392 bgcolor=#d6d6d6
| 259392 ||  || — || July 23, 2003 || Palomar || NEAT || — || align=right | 7.0 km || 
|-id=393 bgcolor=#fefefe
| 259393 ||  || — || July 23, 2003 || Palomar || NEAT || — || align=right data-sort-value="0.81" | 810 m || 
|-id=394 bgcolor=#d6d6d6
| 259394 ||  || — || July 20, 2003 || Palomar || NEAT || LUT || align=right | 6.3 km || 
|-id=395 bgcolor=#d6d6d6
| 259395 ||  || — || August 2, 2003 || Haleakala || NEAT || TEL || align=right | 2.3 km || 
|-id=396 bgcolor=#fefefe
| 259396 ||  || — || August 18, 2003 || Campo Imperatore || CINEOS || V || align=right data-sort-value="0.90" | 900 m || 
|-id=397 bgcolor=#fefefe
| 259397 ||  || — || August 20, 2003 || Socorro || LINEAR || PHO || align=right | 2.9 km || 
|-id=398 bgcolor=#fefefe
| 259398 ||  || — || August 19, 2003 || Campo Imperatore || CINEOS || FLO || align=right data-sort-value="0.85" | 850 m || 
|-id=399 bgcolor=#fefefe
| 259399 ||  || — || August 20, 2003 || Campo Imperatore || CINEOS || NYS || align=right | 1.0 km || 
|-id=400 bgcolor=#fefefe
| 259400 ||  || — || August 19, 2003 || Campo Imperatore || CINEOS || — || align=right data-sort-value="0.79" | 790 m || 
|}

259401–259500 

|-bgcolor=#d6d6d6
| 259401 ||  || — || August 20, 2003 || Campo Imperatore || CINEOS || EOS || align=right | 2.4 km || 
|-id=402 bgcolor=#d6d6d6
| 259402 ||  || — || August 20, 2003 || Palomar || NEAT || HYG || align=right | 4.7 km || 
|-id=403 bgcolor=#d6d6d6
| 259403 ||  || — || August 21, 2003 || Campo Imperatore || CINEOS || ALA || align=right | 5.4 km || 
|-id=404 bgcolor=#fefefe
| 259404 ||  || — || August 22, 2003 || Haleakala || NEAT || — || align=right data-sort-value="0.85" | 850 m || 
|-id=405 bgcolor=#d6d6d6
| 259405 ||  || — || August 24, 2003 || Črni Vrh || Črni Vrh || — || align=right | 5.6 km || 
|-id=406 bgcolor=#fefefe
| 259406 ||  || — || August 22, 2003 || Palomar || NEAT || FLO || align=right data-sort-value="0.87" | 870 m || 
|-id=407 bgcolor=#fefefe
| 259407 ||  || — || August 22, 2003 || Palomar || NEAT || V || align=right data-sort-value="0.75" | 750 m || 
|-id=408 bgcolor=#fefefe
| 259408 ||  || — || August 23, 2003 || Socorro || LINEAR || FLO || align=right data-sort-value="0.91" | 910 m || 
|-id=409 bgcolor=#d6d6d6
| 259409 ||  || — || August 23, 2003 || Palomar || NEAT || — || align=right | 6.1 km || 
|-id=410 bgcolor=#fefefe
| 259410 ||  || — || August 23, 2003 || Palomar || NEAT || — || align=right | 1.2 km || 
|-id=411 bgcolor=#d6d6d6
| 259411 ||  || — || August 23, 2003 || Palomar || NEAT || — || align=right | 3.7 km || 
|-id=412 bgcolor=#d6d6d6
| 259412 ||  || — || August 26, 2003 || Socorro || LINEAR || — || align=right | 3.8 km || 
|-id=413 bgcolor=#d6d6d6
| 259413 ||  || — || August 24, 2003 || Socorro || LINEAR || — || align=right | 4.8 km || 
|-id=414 bgcolor=#fefefe
| 259414 ||  || — || August 26, 2003 || Črni Vrh || H. Mikuž || — || align=right data-sort-value="0.83" | 830 m || 
|-id=415 bgcolor=#fefefe
| 259415 ||  || — || August 24, 2003 || Socorro || LINEAR || — || align=right data-sort-value="0.87" | 870 m || 
|-id=416 bgcolor=#d6d6d6
| 259416 ||  || — || August 24, 2003 || Socorro || LINEAR || EUP || align=right | 5.4 km || 
|-id=417 bgcolor=#d6d6d6
| 259417 ||  || — || August 25, 2003 || Socorro || LINEAR || — || align=right | 5.0 km || 
|-id=418 bgcolor=#fefefe
| 259418 ||  || — || August 29, 2003 || Haleakala || NEAT || — || align=right | 1.2 km || 
|-id=419 bgcolor=#d6d6d6
| 259419 ||  || — || August 31, 2003 || Kitt Peak || Spacewatch || — || align=right | 4.2 km || 
|-id=420 bgcolor=#fefefe
| 259420 ||  || — || August 31, 2003 || Haleakala || NEAT || — || align=right | 1.2 km || 
|-id=421 bgcolor=#fefefe
| 259421 ||  || — || August 30, 2003 || Kitt Peak || Spacewatch || — || align=right | 1.2 km || 
|-id=422 bgcolor=#fefefe
| 259422 ||  || — || September 1, 2003 || Socorro || LINEAR || NYS || align=right data-sort-value="0.88" | 880 m || 
|-id=423 bgcolor=#d6d6d6
| 259423 ||  || — || September 4, 2003 || Socorro || LINEAR || EOS || align=right | 3.2 km || 
|-id=424 bgcolor=#d6d6d6
| 259424 ||  || — || September 14, 2003 || Palomar || NEAT || — || align=right | 4.2 km || 
|-id=425 bgcolor=#d6d6d6
| 259425 ||  || — || September 15, 2003 || Anderson Mesa || LONEOS || SHU3:2 || align=right | 9.3 km || 
|-id=426 bgcolor=#fefefe
| 259426 ||  || — || September 16, 2003 || Palomar || NEAT || FLO || align=right data-sort-value="0.76" | 760 m || 
|-id=427 bgcolor=#d6d6d6
| 259427 ||  || — || September 16, 2003 || Kitt Peak || Spacewatch || VER || align=right | 3.7 km || 
|-id=428 bgcolor=#fefefe
| 259428 ||  || — || September 16, 2003 || Palomar || NEAT || — || align=right | 1.2 km || 
|-id=429 bgcolor=#fefefe
| 259429 ||  || — || September 16, 2003 || Kitt Peak || Spacewatch || — || align=right | 1.4 km || 
|-id=430 bgcolor=#FA8072
| 259430 ||  || — || September 17, 2003 || Palomar || NEAT || — || align=right data-sort-value="0.94" | 940 m || 
|-id=431 bgcolor=#fefefe
| 259431 ||  || — || September 17, 2003 || Kitt Peak || Spacewatch || — || align=right | 1.0 km || 
|-id=432 bgcolor=#fefefe
| 259432 ||  || — || September 17, 2003 || Kitt Peak || Spacewatch || — || align=right data-sort-value="0.87" | 870 m || 
|-id=433 bgcolor=#fefefe
| 259433 ||  || — || September 18, 2003 || Campo Imperatore || CINEOS || NYS || align=right data-sort-value="0.86" | 860 m || 
|-id=434 bgcolor=#fefefe
| 259434 ||  || — || September 16, 2003 || Kitt Peak || Spacewatch || — || align=right data-sort-value="0.72" | 720 m || 
|-id=435 bgcolor=#fefefe
| 259435 ||  || — || September 17, 2003 || Kitt Peak || Spacewatch || FLO || align=right data-sort-value="0.68" | 680 m || 
|-id=436 bgcolor=#d6d6d6
| 259436 ||  || — || September 18, 2003 || Palomar || NEAT || 7:4 || align=right | 5.1 km || 
|-id=437 bgcolor=#fefefe
| 259437 ||  || — || September 18, 2003 || Palomar || NEAT || — || align=right | 1.1 km || 
|-id=438 bgcolor=#fefefe
| 259438 ||  || — || September 18, 2003 || Palomar || NEAT || — || align=right data-sort-value="0.87" | 870 m || 
|-id=439 bgcolor=#fefefe
| 259439 ||  || — || September 18, 2003 || Kitt Peak || Spacewatch || — || align=right data-sort-value="0.79" | 790 m || 
|-id=440 bgcolor=#fefefe
| 259440 ||  || — || September 16, 2003 || Anderson Mesa || LONEOS || NYS || align=right data-sort-value="0.86" | 860 m || 
|-id=441 bgcolor=#fefefe
| 259441 ||  || — || September 16, 2003 || Palomar || NEAT || — || align=right | 1.1 km || 
|-id=442 bgcolor=#fefefe
| 259442 ||  || — || September 16, 2003 || Palomar || NEAT || — || align=right data-sort-value="0.87" | 870 m || 
|-id=443 bgcolor=#fefefe
| 259443 ||  || — || September 17, 2003 || Palomar || NEAT || — || align=right | 3.6 km || 
|-id=444 bgcolor=#fefefe
| 259444 ||  || — || September 16, 2003 || Anderson Mesa || LONEOS || — || align=right data-sort-value="0.77" | 770 m || 
|-id=445 bgcolor=#fefefe
| 259445 ||  || — || September 18, 2003 || Palomar || NEAT || — || align=right data-sort-value="0.94" | 940 m || 
|-id=446 bgcolor=#fefefe
| 259446 ||  || — || September 18, 2003 || Palomar || NEAT || — || align=right | 1.1 km || 
|-id=447 bgcolor=#fefefe
| 259447 ||  || — || September 18, 2003 || Palomar || NEAT || — || align=right | 1.0 km || 
|-id=448 bgcolor=#d6d6d6
| 259448 ||  || — || September 16, 2003 || Anderson Mesa || LONEOS || HYG || align=right | 5.4 km || 
|-id=449 bgcolor=#d6d6d6
| 259449 ||  || — || September 17, 2003 || Anderson Mesa || LONEOS || — || align=right | 5.5 km || 
|-id=450 bgcolor=#d6d6d6
| 259450 ||  || — || September 17, 2003 || Kitt Peak || Spacewatch || EOS || align=right | 3.0 km || 
|-id=451 bgcolor=#fefefe
| 259451 ||  || — || September 17, 2003 || Kitt Peak || Spacewatch || — || align=right | 1.2 km || 
|-id=452 bgcolor=#fefefe
| 259452 ||  || — || September 17, 2003 || Haleakala || NEAT || FLO || align=right data-sort-value="0.83" | 830 m || 
|-id=453 bgcolor=#fefefe
| 259453 ||  || — || September 18, 2003 || Kitt Peak || Spacewatch || NYS || align=right data-sort-value="0.79" | 790 m || 
|-id=454 bgcolor=#fefefe
| 259454 ||  || — || September 19, 2003 || Kitt Peak || Spacewatch || FLO || align=right data-sort-value="0.89" | 890 m || 
|-id=455 bgcolor=#fefefe
| 259455 ||  || — || September 18, 2003 || Kitt Peak || Spacewatch || NYS || align=right data-sort-value="0.71" | 710 m || 
|-id=456 bgcolor=#d6d6d6
| 259456 ||  || — || September 18, 2003 || Campo Imperatore || CINEOS || — || align=right | 3.4 km || 
|-id=457 bgcolor=#d6d6d6
| 259457 ||  || — || September 18, 2003 || Anderson Mesa || LONEOS || — || align=right | 4.9 km || 
|-id=458 bgcolor=#fefefe
| 259458 ||  || — || September 18, 2003 || Socorro || LINEAR || — || align=right data-sort-value="0.89" | 890 m || 
|-id=459 bgcolor=#fefefe
| 259459 ||  || — || September 19, 2003 || Palomar || NEAT || — || align=right data-sort-value="0.91" | 910 m || 
|-id=460 bgcolor=#d6d6d6
| 259460 ||  || — || September 20, 2003 || Socorro || LINEAR || — || align=right | 3.7 km || 
|-id=461 bgcolor=#FA8072
| 259461 ||  || — || September 20, 2003 || Palomar || NEAT || — || align=right | 1.0 km || 
|-id=462 bgcolor=#fefefe
| 259462 ||  || — || September 20, 2003 || Socorro || LINEAR || NYS || align=right data-sort-value="0.71" | 710 m || 
|-id=463 bgcolor=#d6d6d6
| 259463 ||  || — || September 20, 2003 || Palomar || NEAT || 7:4 || align=right | 6.1 km || 
|-id=464 bgcolor=#FA8072
| 259464 ||  || — || September 16, 2003 || Kitt Peak || Spacewatch || — || align=right | 1.0 km || 
|-id=465 bgcolor=#fefefe
| 259465 ||  || — || September 18, 2003 || Palomar || NEAT || — || align=right | 1.1 km || 
|-id=466 bgcolor=#fefefe
| 259466 ||  || — || September 18, 2003 || Palomar || NEAT || NYS || align=right | 1.1 km || 
|-id=467 bgcolor=#fefefe
| 259467 ||  || — || September 20, 2003 || Socorro || LINEAR || — || align=right data-sort-value="0.91" | 910 m || 
|-id=468 bgcolor=#fefefe
| 259468 ||  || — || September 21, 2003 || Socorro || LINEAR || — || align=right data-sort-value="0.87" | 870 m || 
|-id=469 bgcolor=#fefefe
| 259469 ||  || — || September 20, 2003 || Socorro || LINEAR || — || align=right | 1.0 km || 
|-id=470 bgcolor=#fefefe
| 259470 ||  || — || September 17, 2003 || Socorro || LINEAR || — || align=right | 1.2 km || 
|-id=471 bgcolor=#fefefe
| 259471 ||  || — || September 19, 2003 || Anderson Mesa || LONEOS || — || align=right | 1.1 km || 
|-id=472 bgcolor=#fefefe
| 259472 ||  || — || September 23, 2003 || Haleakala || NEAT || V || align=right | 1.1 km || 
|-id=473 bgcolor=#fefefe
| 259473 ||  || — || September 23, 2003 || Haleakala || NEAT || — || align=right | 1.0 km || 
|-id=474 bgcolor=#fefefe
| 259474 ||  || — || September 23, 2003 || Haleakala || NEAT || — || align=right | 1.3 km || 
|-id=475 bgcolor=#d6d6d6
| 259475 ||  || — || September 18, 2003 || Palomar || NEAT || HYG || align=right | 4.9 km || 
|-id=476 bgcolor=#d6d6d6
| 259476 ||  || — || September 19, 2003 || Socorro || LINEAR || ALA || align=right | 5.1 km || 
|-id=477 bgcolor=#fefefe
| 259477 ||  || — || September 21, 2003 || Kitt Peak || Spacewatch || FLO || align=right data-sort-value="0.61" | 610 m || 
|-id=478 bgcolor=#fefefe
| 259478 ||  || — || September 22, 2003 || Anderson Mesa || LONEOS || ERI || align=right | 2.2 km || 
|-id=479 bgcolor=#fefefe
| 259479 ||  || — || September 21, 2003 || Anderson Mesa || LONEOS || FLO || align=right | 1.1 km || 
|-id=480 bgcolor=#fefefe
| 259480 ||  || — || September 25, 2003 || Črni Vrh || H. Mikuž || — || align=right | 2.4 km || 
|-id=481 bgcolor=#d6d6d6
| 259481 ||  || — || September 25, 2003 || Kleť || J. Tichá, M. Tichý || — || align=right | 6.7 km || 
|-id=482 bgcolor=#fefefe
| 259482 ||  || — || September 22, 2003 || Anderson Mesa || LONEOS || — || align=right | 1.0 km || 
|-id=483 bgcolor=#d6d6d6
| 259483 ||  || — || September 23, 2003 || Palomar || NEAT || EOS || align=right | 3.3 km || 
|-id=484 bgcolor=#fefefe
| 259484 ||  || — || September 25, 2003 || Palomar || NEAT || V || align=right data-sort-value="0.93" | 930 m || 
|-id=485 bgcolor=#FA8072
| 259485 ||  || — || September 24, 2003 || Palomar || NEAT || — || align=right data-sort-value="0.99" | 990 m || 
|-id=486 bgcolor=#fefefe
| 259486 ||  || — || September 27, 2003 || Desert Eagle || W. K. Y. Yeung || — || align=right data-sort-value="0.90" | 900 m || 
|-id=487 bgcolor=#fefefe
| 259487 ||  || — || September 26, 2003 || Socorro || LINEAR || — || align=right | 1.2 km || 
|-id=488 bgcolor=#fefefe
| 259488 ||  || — || September 25, 2003 || Bergisch Gladbac || W. Bickel || — || align=right data-sort-value="0.77" | 770 m || 
|-id=489 bgcolor=#fefefe
| 259489 ||  || — || September 27, 2003 || Socorro || LINEAR || — || align=right | 1.3 km || 
|-id=490 bgcolor=#FA8072
| 259490 ||  || — || September 26, 2003 || Socorro || LINEAR || — || align=right | 1.2 km || 
|-id=491 bgcolor=#fefefe
| 259491 ||  || — || September 27, 2003 || Kitt Peak || Spacewatch || — || align=right | 1.1 km || 
|-id=492 bgcolor=#fefefe
| 259492 ||  || — || September 24, 2003 || Palomar || NEAT || — || align=right data-sort-value="0.80" | 800 m || 
|-id=493 bgcolor=#fefefe
| 259493 ||  || — || September 25, 2003 || Palomar || NEAT || — || align=right | 1.0 km || 
|-id=494 bgcolor=#fefefe
| 259494 ||  || — || September 26, 2003 || Socorro || LINEAR || NYS || align=right data-sort-value="0.79" | 790 m || 
|-id=495 bgcolor=#d6d6d6
| 259495 ||  || — || September 26, 2003 || Socorro || LINEAR || THM || align=right | 3.2 km || 
|-id=496 bgcolor=#fefefe
| 259496 ||  || — || September 26, 2003 || Socorro || LINEAR || — || align=right | 1.1 km || 
|-id=497 bgcolor=#fefefe
| 259497 ||  || — || September 27, 2003 || Socorro || LINEAR || — || align=right | 1.1 km || 
|-id=498 bgcolor=#fefefe
| 259498 ||  || — || September 28, 2003 || Kitt Peak || Spacewatch || NYS || align=right data-sort-value="0.78" | 780 m || 
|-id=499 bgcolor=#fefefe
| 259499 ||  || — || September 28, 2003 || Kitt Peak || Spacewatch || NYS || align=right data-sort-value="0.98" | 980 m || 
|-id=500 bgcolor=#fefefe
| 259500 ||  || — || September 28, 2003 || Socorro || LINEAR || V || align=right data-sort-value="0.96" | 960 m || 
|}

259501–259600 

|-bgcolor=#fefefe
| 259501 ||  || — || September 30, 2003 || Socorro || LINEAR || FLO || align=right data-sort-value="0.84" | 840 m || 
|-id=502 bgcolor=#fefefe
| 259502 ||  || — || September 20, 2003 || Socorro || LINEAR || FLO || align=right data-sort-value="0.77" | 770 m || 
|-id=503 bgcolor=#fefefe
| 259503 ||  || — || September 21, 2003 || Palomar || NEAT || — || align=right data-sort-value="0.80" | 800 m || 
|-id=504 bgcolor=#fefefe
| 259504 ||  || — || September 28, 2003 || Anderson Mesa || LONEOS || FLO || align=right data-sort-value="0.85" | 850 m || 
|-id=505 bgcolor=#fefefe
| 259505 ||  || — || September 17, 2003 || Palomar || NEAT || — || align=right data-sort-value="0.90" | 900 m || 
|-id=506 bgcolor=#fefefe
| 259506 ||  || — || September 17, 2003 || Palomar || NEAT || — || align=right data-sort-value="0.73" | 730 m || 
|-id=507 bgcolor=#fefefe
| 259507 ||  || — || September 29, 2003 || Anderson Mesa || LONEOS || — || align=right data-sort-value="0.97" | 970 m || 
|-id=508 bgcolor=#d6d6d6
| 259508 ||  || — || September 17, 2003 || Kitt Peak || Spacewatch || — || align=right | 3.5 km || 
|-id=509 bgcolor=#fefefe
| 259509 ||  || — || September 26, 2003 || Apache Point || SDSS || V || align=right | 1.1 km || 
|-id=510 bgcolor=#fefefe
| 259510 ||  || — || September 27, 2003 || Apache Point || SDSS || — || align=right | 1.1 km || 
|-id=511 bgcolor=#d6d6d6
| 259511 ||  || — || September 26, 2003 || Apache Point || SDSS || 7:4 || align=right | 4.5 km || 
|-id=512 bgcolor=#fefefe
| 259512 ||  || — || September 26, 2003 || Apache Point || SDSS || — || align=right | 1.1 km || 
|-id=513 bgcolor=#fefefe
| 259513 ||  || — || September 26, 2003 || Apache Point || SDSS || — || align=right | 1.0 km || 
|-id=514 bgcolor=#d6d6d6
| 259514 ||  || — || September 26, 2003 || Apache Point || SDSS || — || align=right | 5.2 km || 
|-id=515 bgcolor=#fefefe
| 259515 ||  || — || September 27, 2003 || Apache Point || SDSS || V || align=right data-sort-value="0.84" | 840 m || 
|-id=516 bgcolor=#fefefe
| 259516 ||  || — || September 26, 2003 || Apache Point || SDSS || — || align=right | 1.2 km || 
|-id=517 bgcolor=#FA8072
| 259517 ||  || — || October 14, 2003 || Anderson Mesa || LONEOS || — || align=right | 1.1 km || 
|-id=518 bgcolor=#fefefe
| 259518 ||  || — || October 14, 2003 || Anderson Mesa || LONEOS || — || align=right | 1.2 km || 
|-id=519 bgcolor=#fefefe
| 259519 ||  || — || October 14, 2003 || Anderson Mesa || LONEOS || MAS || align=right | 1.1 km || 
|-id=520 bgcolor=#d6d6d6
| 259520 ||  || — || October 1, 2003 || Kitt Peak || Spacewatch || — || align=right | 4.3 km || 
|-id=521 bgcolor=#fefefe
| 259521 ||  || — || October 2, 2003 || Kitt Peak || Spacewatch || FLO || align=right data-sort-value="0.91" | 910 m || 
|-id=522 bgcolor=#fefefe
| 259522 ||  || — || October 3, 2003 || Kitt Peak || Spacewatch || — || align=right data-sort-value="0.96" | 960 m || 
|-id=523 bgcolor=#d6d6d6
| 259523 ||  || — || October 23, 2003 || Junk Bond || Junk Bond Obs. || 3:2 || align=right | 5.1 km || 
|-id=524 bgcolor=#fefefe
| 259524 ||  || — || October 21, 2003 || Fountain Hills || Fountain Hills Obs. || — || align=right | 1.3 km || 
|-id=525 bgcolor=#fefefe
| 259525 ||  || — || October 16, 2003 || Kitt Peak || Spacewatch || — || align=right | 1.0 km || 
|-id=526 bgcolor=#fefefe
| 259526 ||  || — || October 16, 2003 || Kitt Peak || Spacewatch || NYS || align=right data-sort-value="0.96" | 960 m || 
|-id=527 bgcolor=#fefefe
| 259527 ||  || — || October 16, 2003 || Haleakala || NEAT || — || align=right | 1.2 km || 
|-id=528 bgcolor=#fefefe
| 259528 ||  || — || October 17, 2003 || Kitt Peak || Spacewatch || — || align=right data-sort-value="0.58" | 580 m || 
|-id=529 bgcolor=#fefefe
| 259529 ||  || — || October 25, 2003 || Kitt Peak || Spacewatch || — || align=right | 1.3 km || 
|-id=530 bgcolor=#d6d6d6
| 259530 ||  || — || October 18, 2003 || Palomar || NEAT || — || align=right | 5.7 km || 
|-id=531 bgcolor=#fefefe
| 259531 ||  || — || October 18, 2003 || Palomar || NEAT || FLO || align=right data-sort-value="0.84" | 840 m || 
|-id=532 bgcolor=#fefefe
| 259532 ||  || — || October 16, 2003 || Anderson Mesa || LONEOS || FLO || align=right data-sort-value="0.74" | 740 m || 
|-id=533 bgcolor=#fefefe
| 259533 ||  || — || October 16, 2003 || Anderson Mesa || LONEOS || FLO || align=right data-sort-value="0.76" | 760 m || 
|-id=534 bgcolor=#fefefe
| 259534 ||  || — || October 16, 2003 || Anderson Mesa || LONEOS || FLO || align=right data-sort-value="0.79" | 790 m || 
|-id=535 bgcolor=#fefefe
| 259535 ||  || — || October 16, 2003 || Palomar || NEAT || FLO || align=right data-sort-value="0.80" | 800 m || 
|-id=536 bgcolor=#fefefe
| 259536 ||  || — || October 16, 2003 || Anderson Mesa || LONEOS || — || align=right | 1.2 km || 
|-id=537 bgcolor=#fefefe
| 259537 ||  || — || October 17, 2003 || Kitt Peak || Spacewatch || — || align=right data-sort-value="0.94" | 940 m || 
|-id=538 bgcolor=#fefefe
| 259538 ||  || — || October 18, 2003 || Kitt Peak || Spacewatch || FLO || align=right data-sort-value="0.81" | 810 m || 
|-id=539 bgcolor=#d6d6d6
| 259539 ||  || — || October 19, 2003 || Anderson Mesa || LONEOS || — || align=right | 3.9 km || 
|-id=540 bgcolor=#fefefe
| 259540 ||  || — || October 19, 2003 || Kitt Peak || Spacewatch || MAS || align=right | 1.2 km || 
|-id=541 bgcolor=#d6d6d6
| 259541 ||  || — || October 18, 2003 || Palomar || NEAT || — || align=right | 5.9 km || 
|-id=542 bgcolor=#fefefe
| 259542 ||  || — || October 18, 2003 || Palomar || NEAT || — || align=right | 1.1 km || 
|-id=543 bgcolor=#fefefe
| 259543 ||  || — || October 18, 2003 || Kitt Peak || Spacewatch || — || align=right data-sort-value="0.93" | 930 m || 
|-id=544 bgcolor=#fefefe
| 259544 ||  || — || October 19, 2003 || Anderson Mesa || LONEOS || — || align=right | 1.3 km || 
|-id=545 bgcolor=#fefefe
| 259545 ||  || — || October 19, 2003 || Anderson Mesa || LONEOS || V || align=right | 1.1 km || 
|-id=546 bgcolor=#fefefe
| 259546 ||  || — || October 20, 2003 || Socorro || LINEAR || PHO || align=right | 1.0 km || 
|-id=547 bgcolor=#fefefe
| 259547 ||  || — || October 19, 2003 || Kitt Peak || Spacewatch || — || align=right data-sort-value="0.78" | 780 m || 
|-id=548 bgcolor=#fefefe
| 259548 ||  || — || October 19, 2003 || Socorro || LINEAR || — || align=right | 1.5 km || 
|-id=549 bgcolor=#fefefe
| 259549 ||  || — || October 20, 2003 || Socorro || LINEAR || FLO || align=right data-sort-value="0.81" | 810 m || 
|-id=550 bgcolor=#fefefe
| 259550 ||  || — || October 21, 2003 || Kitt Peak || Spacewatch || — || align=right | 1.0 km || 
|-id=551 bgcolor=#fefefe
| 259551 ||  || — || October 21, 2003 || Anderson Mesa || LONEOS || ERI || align=right | 1.5 km || 
|-id=552 bgcolor=#fefefe
| 259552 ||  || — || October 16, 2003 || Anderson Mesa || LONEOS || — || align=right | 1.0 km || 
|-id=553 bgcolor=#fefefe
| 259553 ||  || — || October 18, 2003 || Anderson Mesa || LONEOS || — || align=right | 1.5 km || 
|-id=554 bgcolor=#fefefe
| 259554 ||  || — || October 18, 2003 || Anderson Mesa || LONEOS || NYS || align=right data-sort-value="0.89" | 890 m || 
|-id=555 bgcolor=#FA8072
| 259555 ||  || — || October 18, 2003 || Anderson Mesa || LONEOS || — || align=right data-sort-value="0.98" | 980 m || 
|-id=556 bgcolor=#fefefe
| 259556 ||  || — || October 19, 2003 || Anderson Mesa || LONEOS || FLO || align=right data-sort-value="0.87" | 870 m || 
|-id=557 bgcolor=#fefefe
| 259557 ||  || — || October 21, 2003 || Palomar || NEAT || — || align=right | 1.2 km || 
|-id=558 bgcolor=#fefefe
| 259558 ||  || — || October 20, 2003 || Kitt Peak || Spacewatch || — || align=right | 1.0 km || 
|-id=559 bgcolor=#fefefe
| 259559 ||  || — || October 20, 2003 || Kitt Peak || Spacewatch || NYS || align=right data-sort-value="0.80" | 800 m || 
|-id=560 bgcolor=#fefefe
| 259560 ||  || — || October 20, 2003 || Palomar || NEAT || — || align=right | 1.4 km || 
|-id=561 bgcolor=#fefefe
| 259561 ||  || — || October 21, 2003 || Socorro || LINEAR || V || align=right data-sort-value="0.84" | 840 m || 
|-id=562 bgcolor=#fefefe
| 259562 ||  || — || October 21, 2003 || Socorro || LINEAR || — || align=right | 1.4 km || 
|-id=563 bgcolor=#fefefe
| 259563 ||  || — || October 21, 2003 || Palomar || NEAT || — || align=right | 1.1 km || 
|-id=564 bgcolor=#fefefe
| 259564 ||  || — || October 21, 2003 || Kitt Peak || Spacewatch || FLO || align=right data-sort-value="0.61" | 610 m || 
|-id=565 bgcolor=#fefefe
| 259565 ||  || — || October 22, 2003 || Socorro || LINEAR || — || align=right | 1.1 km || 
|-id=566 bgcolor=#fefefe
| 259566 ||  || — || October 22, 2003 || Kitt Peak || Spacewatch || — || align=right data-sort-value="0.86" | 860 m || 
|-id=567 bgcolor=#fefefe
| 259567 ||  || — || October 20, 2003 || Palomar || NEAT || — || align=right | 1.3 km || 
|-id=568 bgcolor=#fefefe
| 259568 ||  || — || October 21, 2003 || Palomar || NEAT || — || align=right | 1.2 km || 
|-id=569 bgcolor=#fefefe
| 259569 ||  || — || October 21, 2003 || Socorro || LINEAR || NYS || align=right data-sort-value="0.83" | 830 m || 
|-id=570 bgcolor=#fefefe
| 259570 ||  || — || October 21, 2003 || Socorro || LINEAR || — || align=right | 1.6 km || 
|-id=571 bgcolor=#fefefe
| 259571 ||  || — || October 21, 2003 || Kitt Peak || Spacewatch || — || align=right | 1.0 km || 
|-id=572 bgcolor=#fefefe
| 259572 ||  || — || October 21, 2003 || Palomar || NEAT || NYS || align=right data-sort-value="0.83" | 830 m || 
|-id=573 bgcolor=#fefefe
| 259573 ||  || — || October 22, 2003 || Socorro || LINEAR || — || align=right | 1.0 km || 
|-id=574 bgcolor=#fefefe
| 259574 ||  || — || October 22, 2003 || Kitt Peak || Spacewatch || NYS || align=right data-sort-value="0.67" | 670 m || 
|-id=575 bgcolor=#fefefe
| 259575 ||  || — || October 22, 2003 || Palomar || NEAT || — || align=right | 1.3 km || 
|-id=576 bgcolor=#fefefe
| 259576 ||  || — || October 22, 2003 || Kitt Peak || Spacewatch || — || align=right | 1.4 km || 
|-id=577 bgcolor=#d6d6d6
| 259577 ||  || — || October 20, 2003 || Kitt Peak || Spacewatch || HYG || align=right | 4.5 km || 
|-id=578 bgcolor=#fefefe
| 259578 ||  || — || October 21, 2003 || Anderson Mesa || LONEOS || — || align=right data-sort-value="0.86" | 860 m || 
|-id=579 bgcolor=#fefefe
| 259579 ||  || — || October 21, 2003 || Socorro || LINEAR || — || align=right | 1.3 km || 
|-id=580 bgcolor=#fefefe
| 259580 ||  || — || October 22, 2003 || Kitt Peak || Spacewatch || MAS || align=right data-sort-value="0.96" | 960 m || 
|-id=581 bgcolor=#fefefe
| 259581 ||  || — || October 23, 2003 || Kitt Peak || Spacewatch || NYS || align=right data-sort-value="0.80" | 800 m || 
|-id=582 bgcolor=#fefefe
| 259582 ||  || — || October 24, 2003 || Socorro || LINEAR || — || align=right | 1.1 km || 
|-id=583 bgcolor=#d6d6d6
| 259583 ||  || — || October 21, 2003 || Socorro || LINEAR || HYG || align=right | 3.4 km || 
|-id=584 bgcolor=#fefefe
| 259584 ||  || — || October 21, 2003 || Socorro || LINEAR || NYS || align=right | 1.2 km || 
|-id=585 bgcolor=#fefefe
| 259585 ||  || — || October 21, 2003 || Kitt Peak || Spacewatch || V || align=right data-sort-value="0.99" | 990 m || 
|-id=586 bgcolor=#fefefe
| 259586 ||  || — || October 21, 2003 || Kitt Peak || Spacewatch || V || align=right data-sort-value="0.94" | 940 m || 
|-id=587 bgcolor=#fefefe
| 259587 ||  || — || October 23, 2003 || Anderson Mesa || LONEOS || NYS || align=right data-sort-value="0.77" | 770 m || 
|-id=588 bgcolor=#fefefe
| 259588 ||  || — || October 24, 2003 || Kitt Peak || Spacewatch || MAS || align=right data-sort-value="0.83" | 830 m || 
|-id=589 bgcolor=#fefefe
| 259589 ||  || — || October 22, 2003 || Kitt Peak || Spacewatch || — || align=right | 1.4 km || 
|-id=590 bgcolor=#fefefe
| 259590 ||  || — || October 23, 2003 || Haleakala || NEAT || — || align=right | 1.1 km || 
|-id=591 bgcolor=#d6d6d6
| 259591 ||  || — || October 24, 2003 || Kitt Peak || Spacewatch || SHU3:2 || align=right | 4.9 km || 
|-id=592 bgcolor=#d6d6d6
| 259592 ||  || — || October 24, 2003 || Kitt Peak || Spacewatch || HYG || align=right | 3.0 km || 
|-id=593 bgcolor=#fefefe
| 259593 ||  || — || October 24, 2003 || Kitt Peak || Spacewatch || — || align=right | 1.1 km || 
|-id=594 bgcolor=#fefefe
| 259594 ||  || — || October 25, 2003 || Kitt Peak || Spacewatch || — || align=right | 1.1 km || 
|-id=595 bgcolor=#fefefe
| 259595 ||  || — || October 25, 2003 || Socorro || LINEAR || — || align=right data-sort-value="0.99" | 990 m || 
|-id=596 bgcolor=#fefefe
| 259596 ||  || — || October 25, 2003 || Kitt Peak || Spacewatch || — || align=right data-sort-value="0.99" | 990 m || 
|-id=597 bgcolor=#fefefe
| 259597 ||  || — || October 28, 2003 || Socorro || LINEAR || NYS || align=right data-sort-value="0.73" | 730 m || 
|-id=598 bgcolor=#fefefe
| 259598 ||  || — || October 23, 2003 || Bergisch Gladbac || W. Bickel || FLO || align=right data-sort-value="0.67" | 670 m || 
|-id=599 bgcolor=#fefefe
| 259599 ||  || — || October 29, 2003 || Socorro || LINEAR || NYS || align=right | 1.0 km || 
|-id=600 bgcolor=#fefefe
| 259600 ||  || — || October 29, 2003 || Socorro || LINEAR || FLO || align=right data-sort-value="0.77" | 770 m || 
|}

259601–259700 

|-bgcolor=#FA8072
| 259601 ||  || — || October 30, 2003 || Socorro || LINEAR || — || align=right data-sort-value="0.91" | 910 m || 
|-id=602 bgcolor=#fefefe
| 259602 ||  || — || October 30, 2003 || Socorro || LINEAR || V || align=right | 1.0 km || 
|-id=603 bgcolor=#d6d6d6
| 259603 ||  || — || October 30, 2003 || Socorro || LINEAR || 7:4 || align=right | 5.8 km || 
|-id=604 bgcolor=#fefefe
| 259604 ||  || — || October 27, 2003 || Kitt Peak || Spacewatch || — || align=right | 1.1 km || 
|-id=605 bgcolor=#fefefe
| 259605 ||  || — || October 27, 2003 || Socorro || LINEAR || FLO || align=right data-sort-value="0.88" | 880 m || 
|-id=606 bgcolor=#fefefe
| 259606 ||  || — || October 29, 2003 || Anderson Mesa || LONEOS || — || align=right | 1.1 km || 
|-id=607 bgcolor=#fefefe
| 259607 ||  || — || October 29, 2003 || Anderson Mesa || LONEOS || V || align=right data-sort-value="0.82" | 820 m || 
|-id=608 bgcolor=#fefefe
| 259608 ||  || — || October 23, 2003 || Kitt Peak || M. W. Buie || — || align=right data-sort-value="0.97" | 970 m || 
|-id=609 bgcolor=#fefefe
| 259609 ||  || — || October 24, 2003 || Kitt Peak || M. W. Buie || V || align=right data-sort-value="0.83" | 830 m || 
|-id=610 bgcolor=#fefefe
| 259610 ||  || — || October 16, 2003 || Kitt Peak || Spacewatch || — || align=right data-sort-value="0.66" | 660 m || 
|-id=611 bgcolor=#fefefe
| 259611 ||  || — || October 18, 2003 || Apache Point || SDSS || — || align=right data-sort-value="0.86" | 860 m || 
|-id=612 bgcolor=#fefefe
| 259612 ||  || — || October 21, 2003 || Kitt Peak || Spacewatch || — || align=right data-sort-value="0.96" | 960 m || 
|-id=613 bgcolor=#fefefe
| 259613 ||  || — || October 22, 2003 || Apache Point || SDSS || — || align=right | 1.0 km || 
|-id=614 bgcolor=#fefefe
| 259614 ||  || — || October 22, 2003 || Apache Point || SDSS || — || align=right data-sort-value="0.99" | 990 m || 
|-id=615 bgcolor=#fefefe
| 259615 ||  || — || November 14, 2003 || Wrightwood || J. W. Young || — || align=right | 1.2 km || 
|-id=616 bgcolor=#fefefe
| 259616 ||  || — || November 14, 2003 || Palomar || NEAT || — || align=right | 1.2 km || 
|-id=617 bgcolor=#fefefe
| 259617 ||  || — || November 15, 2003 || Palomar || NEAT || — || align=right | 1.0 km || 
|-id=618 bgcolor=#fefefe
| 259618 ||  || — || November 15, 2003 || Junk Bond || D. Healy || V || align=right data-sort-value="0.86" | 860 m || 
|-id=619 bgcolor=#fefefe
| 259619 ||  || — || November 15, 2003 || Palomar || NEAT || — || align=right | 1.1 km || 
|-id=620 bgcolor=#fefefe
| 259620 ||  || — || November 16, 2003 || Catalina || CSS || — || align=right | 1.0 km || 
|-id=621 bgcolor=#fefefe
| 259621 ||  || — || November 16, 2003 || Catalina || CSS || — || align=right data-sort-value="0.84" | 840 m || 
|-id=622 bgcolor=#fefefe
| 259622 ||  || — || November 16, 2003 || Catalina || CSS || NYS || align=right data-sort-value="0.88" | 880 m || 
|-id=623 bgcolor=#fefefe
| 259623 ||  || — || November 18, 2003 || Palomar || NEAT || NYS || align=right data-sort-value="0.69" | 690 m || 
|-id=624 bgcolor=#E9E9E9
| 259624 ||  || — || November 19, 2003 || Socorro || LINEAR || — || align=right | 1.4 km || 
|-id=625 bgcolor=#E9E9E9
| 259625 ||  || — || November 20, 2003 || Kitt Peak || Spacewatch || BAR || align=right | 1.8 km || 
|-id=626 bgcolor=#fefefe
| 259626 ||  || — || November 18, 2003 || Palomar || NEAT || — || align=right data-sort-value="0.85" | 850 m || 
|-id=627 bgcolor=#fefefe
| 259627 ||  || — || November 18, 2003 || Palomar || NEAT || — || align=right data-sort-value="0.86" | 860 m || 
|-id=628 bgcolor=#fefefe
| 259628 ||  || — || November 18, 2003 || Kitt Peak || Spacewatch || NYS || align=right data-sort-value="0.52" | 520 m || 
|-id=629 bgcolor=#fefefe
| 259629 ||  || — || November 18, 2003 || Kitt Peak || Spacewatch || — || align=right | 1.0 km || 
|-id=630 bgcolor=#fefefe
| 259630 ||  || — || November 19, 2003 || Kitt Peak || Spacewatch || V || align=right data-sort-value="0.80" | 800 m || 
|-id=631 bgcolor=#fefefe
| 259631 ||  || — || November 19, 2003 || Kitt Peak || Spacewatch || NYS || align=right | 1.1 km || 
|-id=632 bgcolor=#fefefe
| 259632 ||  || — || November 19, 2003 || Kitt Peak || Spacewatch || — || align=right data-sort-value="0.99" | 990 m || 
|-id=633 bgcolor=#fefefe
| 259633 ||  || — || November 19, 2003 || Kitt Peak || Spacewatch || V || align=right data-sort-value="0.93" | 930 m || 
|-id=634 bgcolor=#fefefe
| 259634 ||  || — || November 19, 2003 || Kitt Peak || Spacewatch || NYS || align=right data-sort-value="0.83" | 830 m || 
|-id=635 bgcolor=#fefefe
| 259635 ||  || — || November 19, 2003 || Kitt Peak || Spacewatch || — || align=right | 1.2 km || 
|-id=636 bgcolor=#fefefe
| 259636 ||  || — || November 19, 2003 || Kitt Peak || Spacewatch || NYS || align=right data-sort-value="0.96" | 960 m || 
|-id=637 bgcolor=#fefefe
| 259637 ||  || — || November 20, 2003 || Socorro || LINEAR || — || align=right | 1.7 km || 
|-id=638 bgcolor=#fefefe
| 259638 ||  || — || November 20, 2003 || Needville || Needville Obs. || FLO || align=right data-sort-value="0.92" | 920 m || 
|-id=639 bgcolor=#fefefe
| 259639 ||  || — || November 19, 2003 || Palomar || NEAT || FLO || align=right data-sort-value="0.97" | 970 m || 
|-id=640 bgcolor=#fefefe
| 259640 ||  || — || November 19, 2003 || Kitt Peak || Spacewatch || — || align=right data-sort-value="0.89" | 890 m || 
|-id=641 bgcolor=#fefefe
| 259641 ||  || — || November 18, 2003 || Palomar || NEAT || FLO || align=right data-sort-value="0.88" | 880 m || 
|-id=642 bgcolor=#fefefe
| 259642 ||  || — || November 19, 2003 || Kitt Peak || Spacewatch || — || align=right data-sort-value="0.90" | 900 m || 
|-id=643 bgcolor=#fefefe
| 259643 ||  || — || November 20, 2003 || Socorro || LINEAR || NYS || align=right | 1.0 km || 
|-id=644 bgcolor=#fefefe
| 259644 ||  || — || November 20, 2003 || Socorro || LINEAR || — || align=right | 1.2 km || 
|-id=645 bgcolor=#fefefe
| 259645 ||  || — || November 20, 2003 || Socorro || LINEAR || — || align=right data-sort-value="0.96" | 960 m || 
|-id=646 bgcolor=#fefefe
| 259646 ||  || — || November 19, 2003 || Socorro || LINEAR || FLO || align=right data-sort-value="0.82" | 820 m || 
|-id=647 bgcolor=#fefefe
| 259647 ||  || — || November 20, 2003 || Palomar || NEAT || — || align=right | 3.7 km || 
|-id=648 bgcolor=#fefefe
| 259648 ||  || — || November 16, 2003 || Kitt Peak || Spacewatch || NYS || align=right data-sort-value="0.55" | 550 m || 
|-id=649 bgcolor=#fefefe
| 259649 ||  || — || November 19, 2003 || Anderson Mesa || LONEOS || — || align=right | 1.2 km || 
|-id=650 bgcolor=#fefefe
| 259650 ||  || — || November 21, 2003 || Socorro || LINEAR || — || align=right | 1.3 km || 
|-id=651 bgcolor=#fefefe
| 259651 ||  || — || November 21, 2003 || Socorro || LINEAR || — || align=right data-sort-value="0.70" | 700 m || 
|-id=652 bgcolor=#fefefe
| 259652 ||  || — || November 21, 2003 || Socorro || LINEAR || — || align=right | 1.6 km || 
|-id=653 bgcolor=#fefefe
| 259653 ||  || — || November 20, 2003 || Socorro || LINEAR || — || align=right | 1.1 km || 
|-id=654 bgcolor=#fefefe
| 259654 ||  || — || November 20, 2003 || Socorro || LINEAR || — || align=right | 1.2 km || 
|-id=655 bgcolor=#fefefe
| 259655 ||  || — || November 20, 2003 || Socorro || LINEAR || V || align=right | 1.1 km || 
|-id=656 bgcolor=#fefefe
| 259656 ||  || — || November 20, 2003 || Socorro || LINEAR || FLO || align=right data-sort-value="0.90" | 900 m || 
|-id=657 bgcolor=#fefefe
| 259657 ||  || — || November 20, 2003 || Socorro || LINEAR || — || align=right | 1.1 km || 
|-id=658 bgcolor=#E9E9E9
| 259658 ||  || — || November 20, 2003 || Socorro || LINEAR || — || align=right | 1.9 km || 
|-id=659 bgcolor=#fefefe
| 259659 ||  || — || November 20, 2003 || Socorro || LINEAR || — || align=right | 1.6 km || 
|-id=660 bgcolor=#fefefe
| 259660 ||  || — || November 21, 2003 || Palomar || NEAT || — || align=right data-sort-value="0.94" | 940 m || 
|-id=661 bgcolor=#fefefe
| 259661 ||  || — || November 21, 2003 || Palomar || NEAT || V || align=right data-sort-value="0.88" | 880 m || 
|-id=662 bgcolor=#fefefe
| 259662 ||  || — || November 21, 2003 || Socorro || LINEAR || — || align=right | 1.1 km || 
|-id=663 bgcolor=#fefefe
| 259663 ||  || — || November 21, 2003 || Socorro || LINEAR || FLO || align=right data-sort-value="0.79" | 790 m || 
|-id=664 bgcolor=#fefefe
| 259664 ||  || — || November 21, 2003 || Socorro || LINEAR || — || align=right | 1.2 km || 
|-id=665 bgcolor=#fefefe
| 259665 ||  || — || November 21, 2003 || Socorro || LINEAR || — || align=right | 1.1 km || 
|-id=666 bgcolor=#fefefe
| 259666 ||  || — || November 20, 2003 || Socorro || LINEAR || — || align=right | 1.1 km || 
|-id=667 bgcolor=#E9E9E9
| 259667 ||  || — || November 21, 2003 || Socorro || LINEAR || — || align=right | 1.2 km || 
|-id=668 bgcolor=#fefefe
| 259668 ||  || — || November 23, 2003 || Kitt Peak || Spacewatch || FLO || align=right data-sort-value="0.91" | 910 m || 
|-id=669 bgcolor=#fefefe
| 259669 ||  || — || November 30, 2003 || Kitt Peak || Spacewatch || — || align=right | 1.0 km || 
|-id=670 bgcolor=#fefefe
| 259670 ||  || — || November 30, 2003 || Kitt Peak || Spacewatch || NYS || align=right data-sort-value="0.77" | 770 m || 
|-id=671 bgcolor=#fefefe
| 259671 ||  || — || November 30, 2003 || Kitt Peak || Spacewatch || — || align=right data-sort-value="0.83" | 830 m || 
|-id=672 bgcolor=#fefefe
| 259672 ||  || — || October 1, 1999 || Kitt Peak || Spacewatch || — || align=right data-sort-value="0.80" | 800 m || 
|-id=673 bgcolor=#fefefe
| 259673 ||  || — || November 21, 2003 || Catalina || CSS || — || align=right | 1.1 km || 
|-id=674 bgcolor=#fefefe
| 259674 ||  || — || November 22, 2003 || Kitt Peak || M. W. Buie || NYS || align=right data-sort-value="0.77" | 770 m || 
|-id=675 bgcolor=#E9E9E9
| 259675 ||  || — || December 1, 2003 || Socorro || LINEAR || — || align=right | 1.4 km || 
|-id=676 bgcolor=#fefefe
| 259676 ||  || — || December 1, 2003 || Socorro || LINEAR || V || align=right | 1.1 km || 
|-id=677 bgcolor=#fefefe
| 259677 ||  || — || December 4, 2003 || Socorro || LINEAR || — || align=right | 1.3 km || 
|-id=678 bgcolor=#fefefe
| 259678 ||  || — || December 4, 2003 || Socorro || LINEAR || — || align=right | 2.8 km || 
|-id=679 bgcolor=#E9E9E9
| 259679 ||  || — || December 1, 2003 || Socorro || LINEAR || HNS || align=right | 1.9 km || 
|-id=680 bgcolor=#fefefe
| 259680 ||  || — || December 13, 2003 || Wrightwood || J. W. Young || V || align=right data-sort-value="0.97" | 970 m || 
|-id=681 bgcolor=#fefefe
| 259681 ||  || — || December 14, 2003 || Kitt Peak || Spacewatch || FLO || align=right data-sort-value="0.81" | 810 m || 
|-id=682 bgcolor=#fefefe
| 259682 ||  || — || December 14, 2003 || Palomar || NEAT || NYS || align=right data-sort-value="0.91" | 910 m || 
|-id=683 bgcolor=#fefefe
| 259683 ||  || — || December 15, 2003 || Junk Bond || Junk Bond Obs. || — || align=right | 1.2 km || 
|-id=684 bgcolor=#fefefe
| 259684 ||  || — || December 14, 2003 || Kitt Peak || Spacewatch || NYS || align=right data-sort-value="0.72" | 720 m || 
|-id=685 bgcolor=#fefefe
| 259685 ||  || — || December 15, 2003 || Palomar || NEAT || — || align=right | 1.5 km || 
|-id=686 bgcolor=#fefefe
| 259686 ||  || — || December 14, 2003 || Kitt Peak || Spacewatch || — || align=right | 2.4 km || 
|-id=687 bgcolor=#E9E9E9
| 259687 ||  || — || December 14, 2003 || Kitt Peak || Spacewatch || — || align=right | 2.3 km || 
|-id=688 bgcolor=#fefefe
| 259688 ||  || — || December 14, 2003 || Kitt Peak || Spacewatch || — || align=right data-sort-value="0.99" | 990 m || 
|-id=689 bgcolor=#fefefe
| 259689 ||  || — || December 3, 2003 || Socorro || LINEAR || V || align=right data-sort-value="0.89" | 890 m || 
|-id=690 bgcolor=#fefefe
| 259690 ||  || — || December 4, 2003 || Socorro || LINEAR || — || align=right | 1.2 km || 
|-id=691 bgcolor=#FA8072
| 259691 ||  || — || December 18, 2003 || Socorro || LINEAR || — || align=right | 1.6 km || 
|-id=692 bgcolor=#fefefe
| 259692 ||  || — || December 16, 2003 || Kitt Peak || Spacewatch || — || align=right | 1.3 km || 
|-id=693 bgcolor=#fefefe
| 259693 ||  || — || December 17, 2003 || Socorro || LINEAR || — || align=right | 1.3 km || 
|-id=694 bgcolor=#E9E9E9
| 259694 ||  || — || December 17, 2003 || Kitt Peak || Spacewatch || — || align=right | 3.0 km || 
|-id=695 bgcolor=#fefefe
| 259695 ||  || — || December 17, 2003 || Kitt Peak || Spacewatch || — || align=right data-sort-value="0.96" | 960 m || 
|-id=696 bgcolor=#fefefe
| 259696 ||  || — || December 17, 2003 || Kitt Peak || Spacewatch || — || align=right | 1.1 km || 
|-id=697 bgcolor=#fefefe
| 259697 ||  || — || December 17, 2003 || Kitt Peak || Spacewatch || MAS || align=right data-sort-value="0.86" | 860 m || 
|-id=698 bgcolor=#FA8072
| 259698 ||  || — || December 17, 2003 || Kitt Peak || Spacewatch || — || align=right data-sort-value="0.92" | 920 m || 
|-id=699 bgcolor=#fefefe
| 259699 ||  || — || December 17, 2003 || Kitt Peak || Spacewatch || V || align=right data-sort-value="0.98" | 980 m || 
|-id=700 bgcolor=#fefefe
| 259700 ||  || — || December 18, 2003 || Socorro || LINEAR || — || align=right | 1.1 km || 
|}

259701–259800 

|-bgcolor=#fefefe
| 259701 ||  || — || December 16, 2003 || Catalina || CSS || ERI || align=right | 1.8 km || 
|-id=702 bgcolor=#fefefe
| 259702 ||  || — || December 18, 2003 || Socorro || LINEAR || — || align=right data-sort-value="0.86" | 860 m || 
|-id=703 bgcolor=#fefefe
| 259703 ||  || — || December 18, 2003 || Socorro || LINEAR || ERI || align=right | 2.0 km || 
|-id=704 bgcolor=#fefefe
| 259704 ||  || — || December 19, 2003 || Kitt Peak || Spacewatch || FLO || align=right | 1.2 km || 
|-id=705 bgcolor=#E9E9E9
| 259705 ||  || — || December 19, 2003 || Kitt Peak || Spacewatch || DOR || align=right | 2.8 km || 
|-id=706 bgcolor=#fefefe
| 259706 ||  || — || December 19, 2003 || Kitt Peak || Spacewatch || MAS || align=right data-sort-value="0.82" | 820 m || 
|-id=707 bgcolor=#fefefe
| 259707 ||  || — || December 19, 2003 || Socorro || LINEAR || NYS || align=right | 1.1 km || 
|-id=708 bgcolor=#fefefe
| 259708 ||  || — || December 19, 2003 || Kitt Peak || Spacewatch || — || align=right | 1.1 km || 
|-id=709 bgcolor=#fefefe
| 259709 ||  || — || December 18, 2003 || Socorro || LINEAR || V || align=right | 1.1 km || 
|-id=710 bgcolor=#fefefe
| 259710 ||  || — || December 18, 2003 || Socorro || LINEAR || NYS || align=right data-sort-value="0.79" | 790 m || 
|-id=711 bgcolor=#fefefe
| 259711 ||  || — || December 19, 2003 || Socorro || LINEAR || — || align=right | 1.1 km || 
|-id=712 bgcolor=#fefefe
| 259712 ||  || — || December 19, 2003 || Socorro || LINEAR || FLO || align=right | 1.2 km || 
|-id=713 bgcolor=#fefefe
| 259713 ||  || — || December 19, 2003 || Kitt Peak || Spacewatch || — || align=right | 1.2 km || 
|-id=714 bgcolor=#fefefe
| 259714 ||  || — || December 19, 2003 || Socorro || LINEAR || — || align=right | 1.2 km || 
|-id=715 bgcolor=#fefefe
| 259715 ||  || — || December 19, 2003 || Socorro || LINEAR || — || align=right | 1.1 km || 
|-id=716 bgcolor=#fefefe
| 259716 ||  || — || December 19, 2003 || Socorro || LINEAR || — || align=right | 1.1 km || 
|-id=717 bgcolor=#fefefe
| 259717 ||  || — || December 18, 2003 || Socorro || LINEAR || — || align=right data-sort-value="0.86" | 860 m || 
|-id=718 bgcolor=#fefefe
| 259718 ||  || — || December 18, 2003 || Kitt Peak || Spacewatch || FLO || align=right data-sort-value="0.83" | 830 m || 
|-id=719 bgcolor=#fefefe
| 259719 ||  || — || December 18, 2003 || Socorro || LINEAR || — || align=right | 1.4 km || 
|-id=720 bgcolor=#fefefe
| 259720 ||  || — || December 18, 2003 || Socorro || LINEAR || — || align=right | 1.1 km || 
|-id=721 bgcolor=#fefefe
| 259721 ||  || — || December 19, 2003 || Socorro || LINEAR || — || align=right | 1.1 km || 
|-id=722 bgcolor=#fefefe
| 259722 ||  || — || December 19, 2003 || Socorro || LINEAR || — || align=right | 1.4 km || 
|-id=723 bgcolor=#fefefe
| 259723 ||  || — || December 19, 2003 || Socorro || LINEAR || — || align=right | 1.2 km || 
|-id=724 bgcolor=#E9E9E9
| 259724 ||  || — || December 19, 2003 || Socorro || LINEAR || — || align=right | 1.3 km || 
|-id=725 bgcolor=#fefefe
| 259725 ||  || — || December 19, 2003 || Kitt Peak || Spacewatch || NYS || align=right data-sort-value="0.84" | 840 m || 
|-id=726 bgcolor=#fefefe
| 259726 ||  || — || December 21, 2003 || Socorro || LINEAR || — || align=right | 1.1 km || 
|-id=727 bgcolor=#fefefe
| 259727 ||  || — || December 21, 2003 || Kitt Peak || Spacewatch || — || align=right | 1.4 km || 
|-id=728 bgcolor=#fefefe
| 259728 ||  || — || December 19, 2003 || Socorro || LINEAR || NYS || align=right data-sort-value="0.69" | 690 m || 
|-id=729 bgcolor=#fefefe
| 259729 ||  || — || December 19, 2003 || Socorro || LINEAR || — || align=right data-sort-value="0.89" | 890 m || 
|-id=730 bgcolor=#fefefe
| 259730 ||  || — || December 19, 2003 || Socorro || LINEAR || MAS || align=right data-sort-value="0.93" | 930 m || 
|-id=731 bgcolor=#E9E9E9
| 259731 ||  || — || December 19, 2003 || Socorro || LINEAR || EUN || align=right | 2.0 km || 
|-id=732 bgcolor=#E9E9E9
| 259732 ||  || — || December 19, 2003 || Socorro || LINEAR || — || align=right | 2.3 km || 
|-id=733 bgcolor=#E9E9E9
| 259733 ||  || — || December 21, 2003 || Kitt Peak || Spacewatch || — || align=right | 1.6 km || 
|-id=734 bgcolor=#E9E9E9
| 259734 ||  || — || December 23, 2003 || Socorro || LINEAR || — || align=right | 1.3 km || 
|-id=735 bgcolor=#fefefe
| 259735 ||  || — || December 23, 2003 || Socorro || LINEAR || V || align=right data-sort-value="0.86" | 860 m || 
|-id=736 bgcolor=#fefefe
| 259736 ||  || — || December 25, 2003 || Haleakala || NEAT || — || align=right data-sort-value="0.93" | 930 m || 
|-id=737 bgcolor=#fefefe
| 259737 ||  || — || December 27, 2003 || Socorro || LINEAR || — || align=right | 1.2 km || 
|-id=738 bgcolor=#fefefe
| 259738 ||  || — || December 28, 2003 || Socorro || LINEAR || — || align=right | 1.8 km || 
|-id=739 bgcolor=#fefefe
| 259739 ||  || — || December 29, 2003 || Catalina || CSS || — || align=right | 1.6 km || 
|-id=740 bgcolor=#fefefe
| 259740 ||  || — || December 29, 2003 || Socorro || LINEAR || — || align=right | 1.1 km || 
|-id=741 bgcolor=#E9E9E9
| 259741 ||  || — || December 30, 2003 || Socorro || LINEAR || — || align=right | 3.8 km || 
|-id=742 bgcolor=#fefefe
| 259742 ||  || — || December 17, 2003 || Socorro || LINEAR || — || align=right | 1.5 km || 
|-id=743 bgcolor=#fefefe
| 259743 ||  || — || December 17, 2003 || Anderson Mesa || LONEOS || — || align=right | 1.3 km || 
|-id=744 bgcolor=#fefefe
| 259744 ||  || — || December 17, 2003 || Kitt Peak || Spacewatch || — || align=right | 1.5 km || 
|-id=745 bgcolor=#fefefe
| 259745 ||  || — || December 18, 2003 || Socorro || LINEAR || — || align=right | 1.0 km || 
|-id=746 bgcolor=#fefefe
| 259746 ||  || — || December 18, 2003 || Socorro || LINEAR || FLO || align=right data-sort-value="0.89" | 890 m || 
|-id=747 bgcolor=#fefefe
| 259747 ||  || — || December 18, 2003 || Socorro || LINEAR || — || align=right | 1.5 km || 
|-id=748 bgcolor=#fefefe
| 259748 ||  || — || December 18, 2003 || Kitt Peak || Spacewatch || — || align=right | 1.6 km || 
|-id=749 bgcolor=#fefefe
| 259749 ||  || — || December 18, 2003 || Kitt Peak || Spacewatch || — || align=right data-sort-value="0.80" | 800 m || 
|-id=750 bgcolor=#E9E9E9
| 259750 ||  || — || December 17, 2003 || Socorro || LINEAR || — || align=right | 1.5 km || 
|-id=751 bgcolor=#fefefe
| 259751 ||  || — || December 25, 2003 || Apache Point || SDSS || V || align=right | 1.0 km || 
|-id=752 bgcolor=#fefefe
| 259752 ||  || — || December 21, 2003 || Kitt Peak || Spacewatch || MAS || align=right data-sort-value="0.70" | 700 m || 
|-id=753 bgcolor=#FA8072
| 259753 ||  || — || January 5, 2004 || Socorro || LINEAR || PHO || align=right | 1.5 km || 
|-id=754 bgcolor=#fefefe
| 259754 ||  || — || January 13, 2004 || Anderson Mesa || LONEOS || NYS || align=right | 1.2 km || 
|-id=755 bgcolor=#fefefe
| 259755 ||  || — || January 13, 2004 || Anderson Mesa || LONEOS || V || align=right data-sort-value="0.91" | 910 m || 
|-id=756 bgcolor=#fefefe
| 259756 ||  || — || January 13, 2004 || Anderson Mesa || LONEOS || V || align=right data-sort-value="0.91" | 910 m || 
|-id=757 bgcolor=#fefefe
| 259757 ||  || — || January 15, 2004 || Kitt Peak || Spacewatch || NYS || align=right data-sort-value="0.67" | 670 m || 
|-id=758 bgcolor=#E9E9E9
| 259758 ||  || — || January 14, 2004 || Palomar || NEAT || — || align=right | 2.8 km || 
|-id=759 bgcolor=#fefefe
| 259759 ||  || — || January 14, 2004 || Palomar || NEAT || ERI || align=right | 1.9 km || 
|-id=760 bgcolor=#E9E9E9
| 259760 ||  || — || January 15, 2004 || Kitt Peak || Spacewatch || — || align=right | 2.3 km || 
|-id=761 bgcolor=#fefefe
| 259761 ||  || — || January 16, 2004 || Kitt Peak || Spacewatch || — || align=right data-sort-value="0.83" | 830 m || 
|-id=762 bgcolor=#fefefe
| 259762 ||  || — || January 16, 2004 || Palomar || NEAT || MAS || align=right | 1.0 km || 
|-id=763 bgcolor=#fefefe
| 259763 ||  || — || January 16, 2004 || Palomar || NEAT || — || align=right | 1.0 km || 
|-id=764 bgcolor=#E9E9E9
| 259764 ||  || — || January 16, 2004 || Palomar || NEAT || INO || align=right | 1.9 km || 
|-id=765 bgcolor=#fefefe
| 259765 ||  || — || January 16, 2004 || Kitt Peak || Spacewatch || NYS || align=right data-sort-value="0.69" | 690 m || 
|-id=766 bgcolor=#fefefe
| 259766 ||  || — || January 16, 2004 || Kitt Peak || Spacewatch || MAS || align=right data-sort-value="0.98" | 980 m || 
|-id=767 bgcolor=#fefefe
| 259767 ||  || — || January 16, 2004 || Kitt Peak || Spacewatch || — || align=right | 1.3 km || 
|-id=768 bgcolor=#fefefe
| 259768 ||  || — || January 16, 2004 || Palomar || NEAT || MAS || align=right | 1.1 km || 
|-id=769 bgcolor=#fefefe
| 259769 ||  || — || January 17, 2004 || Palomar || NEAT || NYS || align=right data-sort-value="0.82" | 820 m || 
|-id=770 bgcolor=#E9E9E9
| 259770 ||  || — || January 16, 2004 || Palomar || NEAT || — || align=right | 2.9 km || 
|-id=771 bgcolor=#fefefe
| 259771 ||  || — || January 18, 2004 || Kitt Peak || Spacewatch || V || align=right | 1.1 km || 
|-id=772 bgcolor=#E9E9E9
| 259772 ||  || — || January 18, 2004 || Kitt Peak || Spacewatch || — || align=right | 1.4 km || 
|-id=773 bgcolor=#fefefe
| 259773 ||  || — || January 18, 2004 || Kitt Peak || Spacewatch || NYS || align=right data-sort-value="0.92" | 920 m || 
|-id=774 bgcolor=#fefefe
| 259774 ||  || — || January 17, 2004 || Kitt Peak || Spacewatch || — || align=right data-sort-value="0.99" | 990 m || 
|-id=775 bgcolor=#fefefe
| 259775 ||  || — || January 19, 2004 || Anderson Mesa || LONEOS || V || align=right data-sort-value="0.91" | 910 m || 
|-id=776 bgcolor=#FA8072
| 259776 ||  || — || January 21, 2004 || Socorro || LINEAR || PHO || align=right | 2.9 km || 
|-id=777 bgcolor=#fefefe
| 259777 ||  || — || January 18, 2004 || Palomar || NEAT || — || align=right data-sort-value="0.99" | 990 m || 
|-id=778 bgcolor=#fefefe
| 259778 ||  || — || January 18, 2004 || Palomar || NEAT || — || align=right data-sort-value="0.96" | 960 m || 
|-id=779 bgcolor=#fefefe
| 259779 ||  || — || January 19, 2004 || Kitt Peak || Spacewatch || ERI || align=right | 2.0 km || 
|-id=780 bgcolor=#fefefe
| 259780 ||  || — || January 19, 2004 || Kitt Peak || Spacewatch || — || align=right | 1.0 km || 
|-id=781 bgcolor=#fefefe
| 259781 ||  || — || January 19, 2004 || Kitt Peak || Spacewatch || — || align=right | 1.1 km || 
|-id=782 bgcolor=#fefefe
| 259782 ||  || — || January 21, 2004 || Socorro || LINEAR || NYS || align=right data-sort-value="0.82" | 820 m || 
|-id=783 bgcolor=#fefefe
| 259783 ||  || — || January 21, 2004 || Socorro || LINEAR || NYS || align=right data-sort-value="0.74" | 740 m || 
|-id=784 bgcolor=#fefefe
| 259784 ||  || — || January 19, 2004 || Catalina || CSS || — || align=right | 1.2 km || 
|-id=785 bgcolor=#E9E9E9
| 259785 ||  || — || January 22, 2004 || Socorro || LINEAR || — || align=right | 1.4 km || 
|-id=786 bgcolor=#E9E9E9
| 259786 ||  || — || January 21, 2004 || Socorro || LINEAR || — || align=right | 2.5 km || 
|-id=787 bgcolor=#fefefe
| 259787 ||  || — || January 21, 2004 || Socorro || LINEAR || MAS || align=right data-sort-value="0.89" | 890 m || 
|-id=788 bgcolor=#fefefe
| 259788 ||  || — || January 21, 2004 || Socorro || LINEAR || V || align=right data-sort-value="0.91" | 910 m || 
|-id=789 bgcolor=#fefefe
| 259789 ||  || — || January 21, 2004 || Socorro || LINEAR || NYS || align=right data-sort-value="0.88" | 880 m || 
|-id=790 bgcolor=#fefefe
| 259790 ||  || — || January 23, 2004 || Socorro || LINEAR || V || align=right data-sort-value="0.82" | 820 m || 
|-id=791 bgcolor=#E9E9E9
| 259791 ||  || — || January 23, 2004 || Socorro || LINEAR || EUN || align=right | 1.9 km || 
|-id=792 bgcolor=#fefefe
| 259792 ||  || — || January 24, 2004 || Socorro || LINEAR || — || align=right | 1.00 km || 
|-id=793 bgcolor=#fefefe
| 259793 ||  || — || January 22, 2004 || Socorro || LINEAR || NYS || align=right data-sort-value="0.58" | 580 m || 
|-id=794 bgcolor=#fefefe
| 259794 ||  || — || January 22, 2004 || Socorro || LINEAR || MAS || align=right data-sort-value="0.95" | 950 m || 
|-id=795 bgcolor=#fefefe
| 259795 ||  || — || January 22, 2004 || Socorro || LINEAR || NYS || align=right | 1.1 km || 
|-id=796 bgcolor=#E9E9E9
| 259796 ||  || — || January 23, 2004 || Socorro || LINEAR || — || align=right | 2.9 km || 
|-id=797 bgcolor=#fefefe
| 259797 ||  || — || January 21, 2004 || Socorro || LINEAR || ERI || align=right | 2.0 km || 
|-id=798 bgcolor=#fefefe
| 259798 ||  || — || January 22, 2004 || Socorro || LINEAR || MAS || align=right data-sort-value="0.72" | 720 m || 
|-id=799 bgcolor=#fefefe
| 259799 ||  || — || January 22, 2004 || Socorro || LINEAR || NYS || align=right data-sort-value="0.92" | 920 m || 
|-id=800 bgcolor=#fefefe
| 259800 ||  || — || January 24, 2004 || Socorro || LINEAR || NYS || align=right data-sort-value="0.73" | 730 m || 
|}

259801–259900 

|-bgcolor=#d6d6d6
| 259801 ||  || — || January 26, 2004 || Anderson Mesa || LONEOS || 3:2 || align=right | 11 km || 
|-id=802 bgcolor=#FFC2E0
| 259802 ||  || — || January 30, 2004 || Socorro || LINEAR || AMO || align=right data-sort-value="0.63" | 630 m || 
|-id=803 bgcolor=#fefefe
| 259803 ||  || — || January 23, 2004 || Anderson Mesa || LONEOS || V || align=right data-sort-value="0.99" | 990 m || 
|-id=804 bgcolor=#fefefe
| 259804 ||  || — || January 19, 2004 || Socorro || LINEAR || PHO || align=right | 1.3 km || 
|-id=805 bgcolor=#fefefe
| 259805 ||  || — || January 27, 2004 || Catalina || CSS || PHO || align=right | 3.4 km || 
|-id=806 bgcolor=#fefefe
| 259806 ||  || — || January 27, 2004 || Kitt Peak || Spacewatch || — || align=right | 1.2 km || 
|-id=807 bgcolor=#E9E9E9
| 259807 ||  || — || January 27, 2004 || Kitt Peak || Spacewatch || — || align=right | 1.4 km || 
|-id=808 bgcolor=#fefefe
| 259808 ||  || — || January 27, 2004 || Kitt Peak || Spacewatch || SUL || align=right | 1.8 km || 
|-id=809 bgcolor=#fefefe
| 259809 ||  || — || January 28, 2004 || Kitt Peak || Spacewatch || MAS || align=right data-sort-value="0.71" | 710 m || 
|-id=810 bgcolor=#fefefe
| 259810 ||  || — || January 26, 2004 || Anderson Mesa || LONEOS || — || align=right | 1.1 km || 
|-id=811 bgcolor=#fefefe
| 259811 ||  || — || January 26, 2004 || Anderson Mesa || LONEOS || V || align=right data-sort-value="0.97" | 970 m || 
|-id=812 bgcolor=#E9E9E9
| 259812 ||  || — || January 28, 2004 || Catalina || CSS || — || align=right | 1.5 km || 
|-id=813 bgcolor=#E9E9E9
| 259813 ||  || — || January 28, 2004 || Catalina || CSS || ADE || align=right | 3.2 km || 
|-id=814 bgcolor=#fefefe
| 259814 ||  || — || January 28, 2004 || Kitt Peak || Spacewatch || MAS || align=right data-sort-value="0.98" | 980 m || 
|-id=815 bgcolor=#E9E9E9
| 259815 ||  || — || January 29, 2004 || Catalina || CSS || BAR || align=right | 2.2 km || 
|-id=816 bgcolor=#fefefe
| 259816 ||  || — || January 29, 2004 || Anderson Mesa || LONEOS || — || align=right | 1.3 km || 
|-id=817 bgcolor=#E9E9E9
| 259817 ||  || — || January 28, 2004 || Catalina || CSS || — || align=right | 1.8 km || 
|-id=818 bgcolor=#E9E9E9
| 259818 ||  || — || January 28, 2004 || Haleakala || NEAT || — || align=right | 4.1 km || 
|-id=819 bgcolor=#E9E9E9
| 259819 ||  || — || January 31, 2004 || Socorro || LINEAR || EUN || align=right | 1.7 km || 
|-id=820 bgcolor=#E9E9E9
| 259820 ||  || — || January 19, 2004 || Kitt Peak || Spacewatch || — || align=right | 1.3 km || 
|-id=821 bgcolor=#fefefe
| 259821 ||  || — || January 19, 2004 || Kitt Peak || Spacewatch || NYScritical || align=right data-sort-value="0.76" | 760 m || 
|-id=822 bgcolor=#E9E9E9
| 259822 ||  || — || February 12, 2004 || Desert Eagle || W. K. Y. Yeung || RAF || align=right | 1.4 km || 
|-id=823 bgcolor=#fefefe
| 259823 ||  || — || February 10, 2004 || Palomar || NEAT || V || align=right data-sort-value="0.92" | 920 m || 
|-id=824 bgcolor=#fefefe
| 259824 ||  || — || February 10, 2004 || Palomar || NEAT || — || align=right | 1.3 km || 
|-id=825 bgcolor=#fefefe
| 259825 ||  || — || February 10, 2004 || Palomar || NEAT || — || align=right | 1.3 km || 
|-id=826 bgcolor=#E9E9E9
| 259826 ||  || — || February 11, 2004 || Kitt Peak || Spacewatch || — || align=right | 1.1 km || 
|-id=827 bgcolor=#E9E9E9
| 259827 ||  || — || February 11, 2004 || Kitt Peak || Spacewatch || WIT || align=right | 1.2 km || 
|-id=828 bgcolor=#fefefe
| 259828 ||  || — || February 11, 2004 || Kitt Peak || Spacewatch || MAS || align=right data-sort-value="0.84" | 840 m || 
|-id=829 bgcolor=#fefefe
| 259829 ||  || — || February 11, 2004 || Kitt Peak || Spacewatch || NYS || align=right data-sort-value="0.62" | 620 m || 
|-id=830 bgcolor=#fefefe
| 259830 ||  || — || February 10, 2004 || Palomar || NEAT || — || align=right | 1.3 km || 
|-id=831 bgcolor=#fefefe
| 259831 ||  || — || February 12, 2004 || Kitt Peak || Spacewatch || MAS || align=right data-sort-value="0.70" | 700 m || 
|-id=832 bgcolor=#E9E9E9
| 259832 ||  || — || February 12, 2004 || Kitt Peak || Spacewatch || GEF || align=right | 1.8 km || 
|-id=833 bgcolor=#E9E9E9
| 259833 ||  || — || February 11, 2004 || Palomar || NEAT || MRXfast? || align=right | 1.6 km || 
|-id=834 bgcolor=#fefefe
| 259834 ||  || — || February 12, 2004 || Kitt Peak || Spacewatch || CLA || align=right | 1.8 km || 
|-id=835 bgcolor=#fefefe
| 259835 ||  || — || February 12, 2004 || Kitt Peak || Spacewatch || NYS || align=right data-sort-value="0.75" | 750 m || 
|-id=836 bgcolor=#fefefe
| 259836 ||  || — || February 12, 2004 || Kitt Peak || Spacewatch || — || align=right | 1.2 km || 
|-id=837 bgcolor=#E9E9E9
| 259837 ||  || — || February 12, 2004 || Desert Eagle || W. K. Y. Yeung || — || align=right | 1.6 km || 
|-id=838 bgcolor=#fefefe
| 259838 ||  || — || February 10, 2004 || Palomar || NEAT || — || align=right data-sort-value="0.98" | 980 m || 
|-id=839 bgcolor=#fefefe
| 259839 ||  || — || February 10, 2004 || Palomar || NEAT || — || align=right | 1.0 km || 
|-id=840 bgcolor=#fefefe
| 259840 ||  || — || February 12, 2004 || Kitt Peak || Spacewatch || MAS || align=right data-sort-value="0.77" | 770 m || 
|-id=841 bgcolor=#E9E9E9
| 259841 ||  || — || February 13, 2004 || Kitt Peak || Spacewatch || — || align=right | 2.3 km || 
|-id=842 bgcolor=#E9E9E9
| 259842 ||  || — || February 14, 2004 || Haleakala || NEAT || RAF || align=right | 1.4 km || 
|-id=843 bgcolor=#fefefe
| 259843 ||  || — || February 12, 2004 || Palomar || NEAT || H || align=right data-sort-value="0.96" | 960 m || 
|-id=844 bgcolor=#E9E9E9
| 259844 ||  || — || February 13, 2004 || Goodricke-Pigott || Goodricke-Pigott Obs. || HNS || align=right | 1.8 km || 
|-id=845 bgcolor=#fefefe
| 259845 ||  || — || February 14, 2004 || Haleakala || NEAT || — || align=right data-sort-value="0.94" | 940 m || 
|-id=846 bgcolor=#fefefe
| 259846 ||  || — || February 10, 2004 || Palomar || NEAT || — || align=right | 1.3 km || 
|-id=847 bgcolor=#fefefe
| 259847 ||  || — || February 11, 2004 || Kitt Peak || Spacewatch || — || align=right | 1.2 km || 
|-id=848 bgcolor=#fefefe
| 259848 ||  || — || February 11, 2004 || Palomar || NEAT || V || align=right data-sort-value="0.97" | 970 m || 
|-id=849 bgcolor=#fefefe
| 259849 ||  || — || February 12, 2004 || Kitt Peak || Spacewatch || NYS || align=right data-sort-value="0.85" | 850 m || 
|-id=850 bgcolor=#fefefe
| 259850 ||  || — || February 11, 2004 || Palomar || NEAT || — || align=right | 1.2 km || 
|-id=851 bgcolor=#E9E9E9
| 259851 ||  || — || February 11, 2004 || Palomar || NEAT || GEF || align=right | 3.8 km || 
|-id=852 bgcolor=#fefefe
| 259852 ||  || — || February 12, 2004 || Kitt Peak || Spacewatch || — || align=right data-sort-value="0.96" | 960 m || 
|-id=853 bgcolor=#fefefe
| 259853 ||  || — || February 12, 2004 || Kitt Peak || Spacewatch || NYS || align=right data-sort-value="0.65" | 650 m || 
|-id=854 bgcolor=#fefefe
| 259854 ||  || — || February 14, 2004 || Kitt Peak || Spacewatch || — || align=right data-sort-value="0.92" | 920 m || 
|-id=855 bgcolor=#fefefe
| 259855 ||  || — || February 14, 2004 || Kitt Peak || Spacewatch || MAS || align=right data-sort-value="0.96" | 960 m || 
|-id=856 bgcolor=#E9E9E9
| 259856 ||  || — || February 14, 2004 || Kitt Peak || Spacewatch || — || align=right | 2.6 km || 
|-id=857 bgcolor=#E9E9E9
| 259857 ||  || — || February 14, 2004 || Kitt Peak || Spacewatch || — || align=right | 2.8 km || 
|-id=858 bgcolor=#fefefe
| 259858 ||  || — || February 13, 2004 || Kitt Peak || Spacewatch || NYS || align=right data-sort-value="0.89" | 890 m || 
|-id=859 bgcolor=#E9E9E9
| 259859 ||  || — || February 12, 2004 || Palomar || NEAT || — || align=right | 1.9 km || 
|-id=860 bgcolor=#E9E9E9
| 259860 ||  || — || February 13, 2004 || Palomar || NEAT || — || align=right | 2.0 km || 
|-id=861 bgcolor=#E9E9E9
| 259861 ||  || — || February 14, 2004 || Catalina || CSS || — || align=right | 2.0 km || 
|-id=862 bgcolor=#E9E9E9
| 259862 ||  || — || February 12, 2004 || Palomar || NEAT || — || align=right | 3.1 km || 
|-id=863 bgcolor=#E9E9E9
| 259863 ||  || — || February 12, 2004 || Palomar || NEAT || — || align=right | 2.3 km || 
|-id=864 bgcolor=#fefefe
| 259864 ||  || — || February 13, 2004 || Palomar || NEAT || V || align=right data-sort-value="0.92" | 920 m || 
|-id=865 bgcolor=#E9E9E9
| 259865 ||  || — || February 14, 2004 || Socorro || LINEAR || — || align=right | 1.9 km || 
|-id=866 bgcolor=#E9E9E9
| 259866 ||  || — || February 14, 2004 || Haleakala || NEAT || — || align=right | 1.3 km || 
|-id=867 bgcolor=#fefefe
| 259867 ||  || — || February 13, 2004 || Anderson Mesa || LONEOS || V || align=right data-sort-value="0.82" | 820 m || 
|-id=868 bgcolor=#fefefe
| 259868 ||  || — || February 15, 2004 || Socorro || LINEAR || H || align=right | 1.0 km || 
|-id=869 bgcolor=#d6d6d6
| 259869 ||  || — || February 11, 2004 || Kitt Peak || Spacewatch || SHU3:2 || align=right | 7.4 km || 
|-id=870 bgcolor=#fefefe
| 259870 ||  || — || February 12, 2004 || Kitt Peak || Spacewatch || NYS || align=right data-sort-value="0.76" | 760 m || 
|-id=871 bgcolor=#FA8072
| 259871 ||  || — || February 16, 2004 || Kitt Peak || Spacewatch || — || align=right data-sort-value="0.91" | 910 m || 
|-id=872 bgcolor=#E9E9E9
| 259872 ||  || — || February 16, 2004 || Kitt Peak || Spacewatch || EUN || align=right | 1.9 km || 
|-id=873 bgcolor=#fefefe
| 259873 ||  || — || February 17, 2004 || Socorro || LINEAR || — || align=right | 1.2 km || 
|-id=874 bgcolor=#E9E9E9
| 259874 ||  || — || February 16, 2004 || Kitt Peak || Spacewatch || — || align=right | 1.2 km || 
|-id=875 bgcolor=#E9E9E9
| 259875 ||  || — || February 17, 2004 || Palomar || NEAT || — || align=right | 1.9 km || 
|-id=876 bgcolor=#fefefe
| 259876 ||  || — || February 17, 2004 || Socorro || LINEAR || NYS || align=right data-sort-value="0.96" | 960 m || 
|-id=877 bgcolor=#fefefe
| 259877 ||  || — || February 17, 2004 || Catalina || CSS || — || align=right | 2.2 km || 
|-id=878 bgcolor=#E9E9E9
| 259878 ||  || — || February 17, 2004 || Socorro || LINEAR || — || align=right | 4.3 km || 
|-id=879 bgcolor=#fefefe
| 259879 ||  || — || February 17, 2004 || Socorro || LINEAR || — || align=right | 1.1 km || 
|-id=880 bgcolor=#E9E9E9
| 259880 ||  || — || February 17, 2004 || Catalina || CSS || ADE || align=right | 3.5 km || 
|-id=881 bgcolor=#E9E9E9
| 259881 ||  || — || February 18, 2004 || Catalina || CSS || — || align=right | 3.9 km || 
|-id=882 bgcolor=#fefefe
| 259882 ||  || — || February 19, 2004 || Socorro || LINEAR || — || align=right | 1.3 km || 
|-id=883 bgcolor=#fefefe
| 259883 ||  || — || February 16, 2004 || Kitt Peak || Spacewatch || NYS || align=right data-sort-value="0.78" | 780 m || 
|-id=884 bgcolor=#E9E9E9
| 259884 ||  || — || February 16, 2004 || Kitt Peak || Spacewatch || — || align=right | 1.9 km || 
|-id=885 bgcolor=#fefefe
| 259885 ||  || — || February 17, 2004 || Socorro || LINEAR || — || align=right data-sort-value="0.82" | 820 m || 
|-id=886 bgcolor=#fefefe
| 259886 ||  || — || February 18, 2004 || Socorro || LINEAR || NYS || align=right | 1.00 km || 
|-id=887 bgcolor=#E9E9E9
| 259887 ||  || — || February 18, 2004 || Haleakala || NEAT || JUN || align=right | 1.6 km || 
|-id=888 bgcolor=#E9E9E9
| 259888 ||  || — || February 19, 2004 || Socorro || LINEAR || MRX || align=right | 1.6 km || 
|-id=889 bgcolor=#fefefe
| 259889 ||  || — || February 17, 2004 || Kitt Peak || Spacewatch || — || align=right data-sort-value="0.87" | 870 m || 
|-id=890 bgcolor=#E9E9E9
| 259890 ||  || — || February 19, 2004 || Socorro || LINEAR || — || align=right | 2.3 km || 
|-id=891 bgcolor=#fefefe
| 259891 ||  || — || February 19, 2004 || Socorro || LINEAR || MAS || align=right data-sort-value="0.94" | 940 m || 
|-id=892 bgcolor=#E9E9E9
| 259892 ||  || — || February 19, 2004 || Socorro || LINEAR || — || align=right | 2.5 km || 
|-id=893 bgcolor=#fefefe
| 259893 ||  || — || February 25, 2004 || Socorro || LINEAR || — || align=right data-sort-value="0.95" | 950 m || 
|-id=894 bgcolor=#E9E9E9
| 259894 ||  || — || February 25, 2004 || Socorro || LINEAR || — || align=right | 2.1 km || 
|-id=895 bgcolor=#fefefe
| 259895 ||  || — || February 22, 2004 || Kitt Peak || Spacewatch || — || align=right | 1.2 km || 
|-id=896 bgcolor=#E9E9E9
| 259896 ||  || — || February 23, 2004 || Socorro || LINEAR || — || align=right | 3.1 km || 
|-id=897 bgcolor=#d6d6d6
| 259897 ||  || — || February 23, 2004 || Socorro || LINEAR || HIL3:2 || align=right | 7.4 km || 
|-id=898 bgcolor=#fefefe
| 259898 ||  || — || February 23, 2004 || Socorro || LINEAR || MAS || align=right | 1.0 km || 
|-id=899 bgcolor=#E9E9E9
| 259899 ||  || — || February 17, 2004 || Kitt Peak || Spacewatch || — || align=right | 1.1 km || 
|-id=900 bgcolor=#fefefe
| 259900 ||  || — || February 17, 2004 || Kitt Peak || Spacewatch || MAS || align=right data-sort-value="0.76" | 760 m || 
|}

259901–260000 

|-bgcolor=#E9E9E9
| 259901 || 2004 EL || — || March 11, 2004 || Emerald Lane || L. Ball || — || align=right | 1.4 km || 
|-id=902 bgcolor=#E9E9E9
| 259902 ||  || — || March 12, 2004 || Palomar || NEAT || — || align=right | 4.0 km || 
|-id=903 bgcolor=#E9E9E9
| 259903 ||  || — || March 10, 2004 || Palomar || NEAT || — || align=right | 1.8 km || 
|-id=904 bgcolor=#fefefe
| 259904 ||  || — || March 12, 2004 || Palomar || NEAT || — || align=right data-sort-value="0.83" | 830 m || 
|-id=905 bgcolor=#fefefe
| 259905 Vougeot ||  ||  || March 14, 2004 || Vicques || M. Ory || NYS || align=right data-sort-value="0.93" | 930 m || 
|-id=906 bgcolor=#fefefe
| 259906 ||  || — || March 14, 2004 || Catalina || CSS || NYS || align=right data-sort-value="0.90" | 900 m || 
|-id=907 bgcolor=#E9E9E9
| 259907 ||  || — || March 11, 2004 || Palomar || NEAT || — || align=right | 1.9 km || 
|-id=908 bgcolor=#fefefe
| 259908 ||  || — || March 11, 2004 || Palomar || NEAT || NYS || align=right data-sort-value="0.82" | 820 m || 
|-id=909 bgcolor=#E9E9E9
| 259909 ||  || — || March 12, 2004 || Palomar || NEAT || — || align=right | 3.5 km || 
|-id=910 bgcolor=#fefefe
| 259910 ||  || — || March 12, 2004 || Palomar || NEAT || — || align=right | 1.0 km || 
|-id=911 bgcolor=#E9E9E9
| 259911 ||  || — || March 12, 2004 || Palomar || NEAT || HNS || align=right | 1.7 km || 
|-id=912 bgcolor=#fefefe
| 259912 ||  || — || March 12, 2004 || Palomar || NEAT || H || align=right data-sort-value="0.92" | 920 m || 
|-id=913 bgcolor=#fefefe
| 259913 ||  || — || March 14, 2004 || Kitt Peak || Spacewatch || NYS || align=right data-sort-value="0.69" | 690 m || 
|-id=914 bgcolor=#E9E9E9
| 259914 ||  || — || March 15, 2004 || Kitt Peak || Spacewatch || — || align=right | 2.0 km || 
|-id=915 bgcolor=#FA8072
| 259915 ||  || — || March 15, 2004 || Socorro || LINEAR || H || align=right data-sort-value="0.74" | 740 m || 
|-id=916 bgcolor=#fefefe
| 259916 ||  || — || March 15, 2004 || Socorro || LINEAR || H || align=right data-sort-value="0.71" | 710 m || 
|-id=917 bgcolor=#fefefe
| 259917 ||  || — || March 15, 2004 || Črni Vrh || Črni Vrh || — || align=right | 1.2 km || 
|-id=918 bgcolor=#E9E9E9
| 259918 ||  || — || March 14, 2004 || Socorro || LINEAR || — || align=right | 4.3 km || 
|-id=919 bgcolor=#E9E9E9
| 259919 ||  || — || March 10, 2004 || Palomar || NEAT || — || align=right | 1.4 km || 
|-id=920 bgcolor=#fefefe
| 259920 ||  || — || March 13, 2004 || Palomar || NEAT || MAS || align=right data-sort-value="0.93" | 930 m || 
|-id=921 bgcolor=#E9E9E9
| 259921 ||  || — || March 15, 2004 || Kitt Peak || Spacewatch || — || align=right | 1.9 km || 
|-id=922 bgcolor=#fefefe
| 259922 ||  || — || March 15, 2004 || Palomar || NEAT || — || align=right | 1.2 km || 
|-id=923 bgcolor=#E9E9E9
| 259923 ||  || — || March 15, 2004 || Palomar || NEAT || EUN || align=right | 1.7 km || 
|-id=924 bgcolor=#fefefe
| 259924 ||  || — || March 15, 2004 || Palomar || NEAT || — || align=right | 1.6 km || 
|-id=925 bgcolor=#fefefe
| 259925 ||  || — || March 12, 2004 || Palomar || NEAT || — || align=right | 1.1 km || 
|-id=926 bgcolor=#fefefe
| 259926 ||  || — || March 12, 2004 || Palomar || NEAT || NYS || align=right data-sort-value="0.99" | 990 m || 
|-id=927 bgcolor=#fefefe
| 259927 ||  || — || March 13, 2004 || Palomar || NEAT || NYS || align=right data-sort-value="0.90" | 900 m || 
|-id=928 bgcolor=#E9E9E9
| 259928 ||  || — || March 14, 2004 || Kitt Peak || Spacewatch || EUN || align=right | 1.4 km || 
|-id=929 bgcolor=#fefefe
| 259929 ||  || — || March 14, 2004 || Catalina || CSS || — || align=right | 1.6 km || 
|-id=930 bgcolor=#E9E9E9
| 259930 ||  || — || March 15, 2004 || Kitt Peak || Spacewatch || GER || align=right | 1.8 km || 
|-id=931 bgcolor=#fefefe
| 259931 ||  || — || March 15, 2004 || Socorro || LINEAR || — || align=right | 1.3 km || 
|-id=932 bgcolor=#fefefe
| 259932 ||  || — || March 15, 2004 || Catalina || CSS || — || align=right | 1.3 km || 
|-id=933 bgcolor=#fefefe
| 259933 ||  || — || March 15, 2004 || Catalina || CSS || NYS || align=right data-sort-value="0.81" | 810 m || 
|-id=934 bgcolor=#E9E9E9
| 259934 ||  || — || March 15, 2004 || Kitt Peak || Spacewatch || — || align=right | 1.1 km || 
|-id=935 bgcolor=#d6d6d6
| 259935 ||  || — || March 15, 2004 || Kitt Peak || Spacewatch || 3:2 || align=right | 4.9 km || 
|-id=936 bgcolor=#E9E9E9
| 259936 ||  || — || March 15, 2004 || Catalina || CSS || — || align=right | 1.4 km || 
|-id=937 bgcolor=#E9E9E9
| 259937 ||  || — || March 15, 2004 || Kitt Peak || Spacewatch || — || align=right | 2.5 km || 
|-id=938 bgcolor=#E9E9E9
| 259938 ||  || — || March 12, 2004 || Palomar || NEAT || HOF || align=right | 4.0 km || 
|-id=939 bgcolor=#fefefe
| 259939 ||  || — || March 14, 2004 || Kitt Peak || Spacewatch || MAS || align=right data-sort-value="0.94" | 940 m || 
|-id=940 bgcolor=#d6d6d6
| 259940 ||  || — || March 15, 2004 || Socorro || LINEAR || — || align=right | 3.7 km || 
|-id=941 bgcolor=#E9E9E9
| 259941 ||  || — || March 14, 2004 || Palomar || NEAT || HNS || align=right | 1.7 km || 
|-id=942 bgcolor=#E9E9E9
| 259942 ||  || — || March 14, 2004 || Socorro || LINEAR || — || align=right | 2.6 km || 
|-id=943 bgcolor=#E9E9E9
| 259943 ||  || — || March 14, 2004 || Palomar || NEAT || EUN || align=right | 1.9 km || 
|-id=944 bgcolor=#E9E9E9
| 259944 ||  || — || March 15, 2004 || Palomar || NEAT || — || align=right | 3.1 km || 
|-id=945 bgcolor=#E9E9E9
| 259945 ||  || — || March 12, 2004 || Palomar || NEAT || — || align=right | 1.3 km || 
|-id=946 bgcolor=#fefefe
| 259946 ||  || — || March 13, 2004 || Palomar || NEAT || V || align=right data-sort-value="0.83" | 830 m || 
|-id=947 bgcolor=#E9E9E9
| 259947 ||  || — || March 14, 2004 || Catalina || CSS || — || align=right | 1.4 km || 
|-id=948 bgcolor=#fefefe
| 259948 ||  || — || March 15, 2004 || Kitt Peak || Spacewatch || NYS || align=right data-sort-value="0.86" | 860 m || 
|-id=949 bgcolor=#fefefe
| 259949 ||  || — || March 15, 2004 || Socorro || LINEAR || — || align=right | 1.2 km || 
|-id=950 bgcolor=#fefefe
| 259950 ||  || — || March 15, 2004 || Kitt Peak || Spacewatch || NYS || align=right data-sort-value="0.74" | 740 m || 
|-id=951 bgcolor=#E9E9E9
| 259951 ||  || — || March 15, 2004 || Catalina || CSS || — || align=right | 1.1 km || 
|-id=952 bgcolor=#fefefe
| 259952 ||  || — || March 15, 2004 || Kitt Peak || Spacewatch || — || align=right data-sort-value="0.94" | 940 m || 
|-id=953 bgcolor=#fefefe
| 259953 ||  || — || March 12, 2004 || Palomar || NEAT || — || align=right | 1.4 km || 
|-id=954 bgcolor=#E9E9E9
| 259954 ||  || — || March 12, 2004 || Palomar || NEAT || ADE || align=right | 3.1 km || 
|-id=955 bgcolor=#E9E9E9
| 259955 ||  || — || March 14, 2004 || Kitt Peak || Spacewatch || — || align=right | 1.2 km || 
|-id=956 bgcolor=#E9E9E9
| 259956 ||  || — || March 14, 2004 || Kitt Peak || Spacewatch || HNS || align=right | 1.7 km || 
|-id=957 bgcolor=#E9E9E9
| 259957 ||  || — || March 13, 2004 || Palomar || NEAT || EUN || align=right | 1.4 km || 
|-id=958 bgcolor=#fefefe
| 259958 ||  || — || March 15, 2004 || Socorro || LINEAR || — || align=right | 1.6 km || 
|-id=959 bgcolor=#E9E9E9
| 259959 ||  || — || March 15, 2004 || Kitt Peak || Spacewatch || — || align=right | 1.6 km || 
|-id=960 bgcolor=#E9E9E9
| 259960 ||  || — || March 15, 2004 || Socorro || LINEAR || — || align=right | 2.2 km || 
|-id=961 bgcolor=#E9E9E9
| 259961 ||  || — || March 15, 2004 || Kitt Peak || Spacewatch || — || align=right | 1.2 km || 
|-id=962 bgcolor=#E9E9E9
| 259962 ||  || — || March 15, 2004 || Kitt Peak || Spacewatch || — || align=right | 1.1 km || 
|-id=963 bgcolor=#fefefe
| 259963 ||  || — || March 16, 2004 || Goodricke-Pigott || Goodricke-Pigott Obs. || — || align=right | 1.0 km || 
|-id=964 bgcolor=#E9E9E9
| 259964 ||  || — || March 16, 2004 || Kitt Peak || Spacewatch || — || align=right | 3.3 km || 
|-id=965 bgcolor=#fefefe
| 259965 ||  || — || March 19, 2004 || Siding Spring || Siding Spring Obs. || H || align=right data-sort-value="0.76" | 760 m || 
|-id=966 bgcolor=#E9E9E9
| 259966 ||  || — || March 16, 2004 || Socorro || LINEAR || VIB || align=right | 2.8 km || 
|-id=967 bgcolor=#fefefe
| 259967 ||  || — || March 17, 2004 || Kitt Peak || Spacewatch || — || align=right | 2.4 km || 
|-id=968 bgcolor=#E9E9E9
| 259968 ||  || — || March 18, 2004 || Socorro || LINEAR || — || align=right | 1.4 km || 
|-id=969 bgcolor=#E9E9E9
| 259969 ||  || — || March 18, 2004 || Kitt Peak || Spacewatch || — || align=right | 2.5 km || 
|-id=970 bgcolor=#fefefe
| 259970 ||  || — || March 26, 2004 || Socorro || LINEAR || H || align=right data-sort-value="0.80" | 800 m || 
|-id=971 bgcolor=#fefefe
| 259971 ||  || — || March 17, 2004 || Palomar || NEAT || H || align=right | 1.0 km || 
|-id=972 bgcolor=#fefefe
| 259972 ||  || — || March 18, 2004 || Palomar || NEAT || H || align=right | 1.2 km || 
|-id=973 bgcolor=#E9E9E9
| 259973 ||  || — || March 29, 2004 || Socorro || LINEAR || — || align=right | 2.7 km || 
|-id=974 bgcolor=#fefefe
| 259974 ||  || — || March 30, 2004 || Socorro || LINEAR || PHO || align=right | 1.6 km || 
|-id=975 bgcolor=#E9E9E9
| 259975 ||  || — || March 16, 2004 || Socorro || LINEAR || — || align=right | 1.7 km || 
|-id=976 bgcolor=#fefefe
| 259976 ||  || — || March 16, 2004 || Catalina || CSS || — || align=right | 1.6 km || 
|-id=977 bgcolor=#E9E9E9
| 259977 ||  || — || March 16, 2004 || Catalina || CSS || JUN || align=right | 2.0 km || 
|-id=978 bgcolor=#E9E9E9
| 259978 ||  || — || March 16, 2004 || Kitt Peak || Spacewatch || — || align=right | 2.3 km || 
|-id=979 bgcolor=#fefefe
| 259979 ||  || — || March 17, 2004 || Kitt Peak || Spacewatch || — || align=right | 1.3 km || 
|-id=980 bgcolor=#E9E9E9
| 259980 ||  || — || March 18, 2004 || Kitt Peak || Spacewatch || — || align=right | 3.6 km || 
|-id=981 bgcolor=#fefefe
| 259981 ||  || — || March 18, 2004 || Kitt Peak || Spacewatch || MAS || align=right data-sort-value="0.78" | 780 m || 
|-id=982 bgcolor=#E9E9E9
| 259982 ||  || — || March 18, 2004 || Socorro || LINEAR || RAF || align=right | 1.5 km || 
|-id=983 bgcolor=#E9E9E9
| 259983 ||  || — || March 18, 2004 || Socorro || LINEAR || — || align=right | 1.2 km || 
|-id=984 bgcolor=#fefefe
| 259984 ||  || — || March 19, 2004 || Socorro || LINEAR || — || align=right data-sort-value="0.89" | 890 m || 
|-id=985 bgcolor=#E9E9E9
| 259985 ||  || — || March 19, 2004 || Socorro || LINEAR || HNS || align=right | 1.7 km || 
|-id=986 bgcolor=#fefefe
| 259986 ||  || — || March 19, 2004 || Socorro || LINEAR || NYS || align=right data-sort-value="0.93" | 930 m || 
|-id=987 bgcolor=#fefefe
| 259987 ||  || — || March 19, 2004 || Socorro || LINEAR || MAS || align=right | 1.0 km || 
|-id=988 bgcolor=#E9E9E9
| 259988 ||  || — || March 20, 2004 || Socorro || LINEAR || — || align=right | 4.7 km || 
|-id=989 bgcolor=#fefefe
| 259989 ||  || — || March 20, 2004 || Socorro || LINEAR || — || align=right | 1.4 km || 
|-id=990 bgcolor=#E9E9E9
| 259990 ||  || — || March 16, 2004 || Kitt Peak || Spacewatch || — || align=right | 1.3 km || 
|-id=991 bgcolor=#fefefe
| 259991 ||  || — || March 17, 2004 || Kitt Peak || Spacewatch || NYS || align=right | 1.0 km || 
|-id=992 bgcolor=#E9E9E9
| 259992 ||  || — || March 17, 2004 || Kitt Peak || Spacewatch || — || align=right | 1.2 km || 
|-id=993 bgcolor=#E9E9E9
| 259993 ||  || — || March 17, 2004 || Kitt Peak || Spacewatch || — || align=right | 3.1 km || 
|-id=994 bgcolor=#E9E9E9
| 259994 ||  || — || March 17, 2004 || Socorro || LINEAR || WIT || align=right | 1.6 km || 
|-id=995 bgcolor=#E9E9E9
| 259995 ||  || — || March 22, 2004 || Socorro || LINEAR || — || align=right | 1.3 km || 
|-id=996 bgcolor=#E9E9E9
| 259996 ||  || — || March 23, 2004 || Socorro || LINEAR || — || align=right | 1.9 km || 
|-id=997 bgcolor=#E9E9E9
| 259997 ||  || — || March 23, 2004 || Kitt Peak || Spacewatch || — || align=right | 1.7 km || 
|-id=998 bgcolor=#fefefe
| 259998 ||  || — || March 24, 2004 || Anderson Mesa || LONEOS || — || align=right | 1.3 km || 
|-id=999 bgcolor=#E9E9E9
| 259999 ||  || — || March 24, 2004 || Anderson Mesa || LONEOS || HNS || align=right | 1.5 km || 
|-id=000 bgcolor=#fefefe
| 260000 ||  || — || March 26, 2004 || Kitt Peak || Spacewatch || V || align=right data-sort-value="0.92" | 920 m || 
|}

References

External links 
 Discovery Circumstances: Numbered Minor Planets (255001)–(260000) (IAU Minor Planet Center)

0259